= List of anti-tank guns =

Anti-tank guns are typically high-velocity guns designed to fire anti-tank shells. They are usually designed to be easily transported and concealed to maximize responsiveness and surprise.

== Towed anti-tank guns ==
Caliber (mm)	Weapon name	Country of origin	Period
13.2	MG 18 TuF	German Empire	World War I
25	25 mm Hotchkiss anti-tank gun	France	World War II
25	25 mm APX modèle 1937	France	World War II
25	Type 96 25 mm AT/AA gun	Japan	World War II
28 - 20	2.8 cm sPzB 41	Nazi Germany	World War II
37	3.7 cm TAK 1918	German Empire	World War I
37	AC 37 anti-tank gun	France	World War II
37	3.7 cm PaK 35/36	Nazi Germany	World War II
37	37 mm anti-tank gun M1930 (1-K)	Soviet Union	World War II
37	Type 94 37 mm	Japan	World War II
37	37 mm Bofors	Sweden	World War II
37	37 mm gun M3	United States	World War II
37	3,7cm KPÚV vz. 34	Czechoslovakia	World War II
37	3,7cm KPÚV vz. 37	Czechoslovakia	World War II
40	Ordnance QF 2 pounder	United Kingdom	World War II
40	Vickers Type 40 mm AT/AA gun	Japan	World War II
42 - 28	4.2 cm PaK 41	Nazi Germany	World War II
45	45 mm anti-tank gun M1932 (19-K)	Soviet Union	World War II
45	45 mm anti-tank gun M1937 (53-K)	Soviet Union	World War II
45	45 mm anti-tank gun M1942 (M-42)	Soviet Union	World War II
47	C.47 F.R.C. Mod.31	Belgium	World War II
47	47 SA 37	France	World War II
47	Type 1 anti-tank gun	Japan	World War II
47	4cm kanón vz. 36	Czechoslovakia	World War II
47	4,7cm KPÚV vz. 38	Czechoslovakia	World War II
47	4.7 cm Böhler	Austria	World War II
47	Cannone da 47/32 M35	Italy	World War II
47	AC 47 anti-tank gun	France	World War II
47	47 mm Schneider-Concordia	Kingdom of Romania	World War II
50	5 cm PaK 38	Nazi Germany	World War II
57	57/76 Pst	Finland	World War II
57	Bofors 57 mm anti-tank gun	Sweden	World War II
57	57 mm anti-tank gun M1941 and M1943 (ZiS-2)	Soviet Union	World War II
57	QF 6 pounder 7 cwt	United Kingdom	World War II
57	57mm M1 anti-tank gun	United States	World War II
75	75 mm field gun M1897 on M2 carriage	United States	World War II
75	75 K/44	Finland	World War II
75	7.5 cm PaK 97/38	Nazi Germany	World War II (1942)
75	7.5 cm PaK 40	Nazi Germany	World War II (1941)
75	7.5 cm PaK 50	Nazi Germany	World War II (1944)
75	75 mm Reșița Model 1943	Kingdom of Romania	World War II (1944)
75 - 55	7.5 cm PaK 41	Nazi Germany	World War II
76.2	7.62 cm PaK 36(r)	Nazi Germany	World War II (1942)
76.2	QF 17 pounder Gun	United Kingdom	World War II
76.2	3-inch Gun M5	United States	World War II
81.4	8 cm PAW 600	Nazi Germany	World War II
85	85 mm vz. 52	Czechoslovakia	Cold War
85	85 mm antitank gun D-48	Soviet Union	Cold War
88	8.8 cm PaK 43	Nazi Germany	World War II
88	8.8 cm PaK 43/41	Nazi Germany	World War II
90	90mm Gun	United States	World War II
90	MECAR KEnerga 90mm	Belgium	Cold War
90	GIAT CN90F1/DEFA D921	France	Cold War
90	Pak 57	Switzerland	Cold War
90	Pansarvärnspjäs 1110	Sweden	Cold War
100	10 cm PAW 1000	Nazi Germany	World War II
100	100 mm field gun M1944 (BS-3)	Soviet Union	World War II
100	2A19 / T-12	Soviet Union	Cold War
100	2A29 / MT-12	Russia	Cold War
100	100 mm vz. 53	Czechoslovakia	Cold War
100	Type 86 anti-tank gun	China	
100	100 mm anti-tank gun M1977	Romania	
100	Tampella 100 PSTK	Finland	Cold War
105	105mm Gun T8	United States	World War II
120	2A60	Russia	Cold War
125	2A45	Russia	Cold War
128	12.8 cm PaK 44	Nazi Germany	World War II

== Self-propelled anti-tank guns ==
Self-propelled anti-tank guns are anti-tank guns mounted on vehicles. Sometimes lightly armored, and often fitted into a turret, they are nonetheless not tanks or assault guns and simply enhance the mobility of anti-tank guns. They are also capable of providing direct fire support.

Caliber (mm)	Weapon name	Country of origin	Period
37	M6 gun motor carriage	United States	World War II
47	Laffly W15TCC	France	World War II
47	Panzerjäger I	Nazi Germany	World War II
47	Semovente 47/32	Italy	World War II
57	AEC Mk I Gun Carrier	United Kingdom	World War II
57	6 pounder Anti-tank Gun portee	United Kingdom	World War II
57	T48 gun motor carriage	United States	World War II
57	ZiS-30	Soviet Union	World War II
75	Jagdpanzer 38(t) / Hetzer	Nazi Germany	World War II
75	Jagdpanzer IV Sd.Kfz. 162	Nazi Germany	World War II
75	Marder I	Nazi Germany	World War II
75	Marder II	Nazi Germany	World War II
75	Marder III Sd.Kfz. 138	Nazi Germany	World War II
75	Type 1 Ho-Ni I	Japan	World War II
75	Type 3 Ho-Ni III	Japan	World War II
75	Mareșal tank destroyer	Kingdom of Romania	World War II
75	M3 gun motor carriage	United States	World War II
76.2	SU-76	Soviet Union	World War II
76.2	Marder III, Sd.Kfz. 139	Nazi Germany	World War II
76.2	SP 17pdr, Valentine, Mk I, Archer	United Kingdom	World War II
76.2	17pdr SP M10 Achilles	United Kingdom	World War II
76.2	SP 17pdr, A30 (Avenger)	United Kingdom	World War II
76.2	M10 tank destroyer	United States	World War II
76	M18 Hellcat	United States	World War II
84/105	FV4401 Contentious	United Kingdom	Cold War
85	SU-85	Soviet Union	World War II (1943–44)
88	Nashorn Sd.Kfz. 164	Nazi Germany	World War II
88	Panzerjäger Tiger (P) Elefant	Nazi Germany	World War II
88	Jagdpanther Sd.Kfz. 173	Nazi Germany	World War II
90	M56 SPG	United States	Cold War
90	Kanonenjagdpanzer	Germany	Cold War
90	M36 tank destroyer	United States	World War II
100	SU-100	Soviet Union	World War II
100	SU-100P	Soviet Union	Cold War
130	SU-100Y	Soviet Union	Cold War
100	SU-101	Soviet Union	Cold War
105	B1 Centauro	Italy	Modern
105	Dicker max	Nazi Germany	World War II
122	SU-122-44	Soviet Union	Cold War
122	SU-122-54	Soviet Union	Cold War
125	2S25	Russia	Modern
120	Type 89	China	Cold War
128	Jagdtiger Sd.Kfz. 186	Nazi Germany	World War II
128	12,8 cm K. L/61 auf VK 3001 (H)	Nazi Germany	World War II
152	ISU-152	Soviet Union	World War II
