= 100 mm anti-tank gun T-12 =

2A19 (T-12) 100 mm anti-tank gun
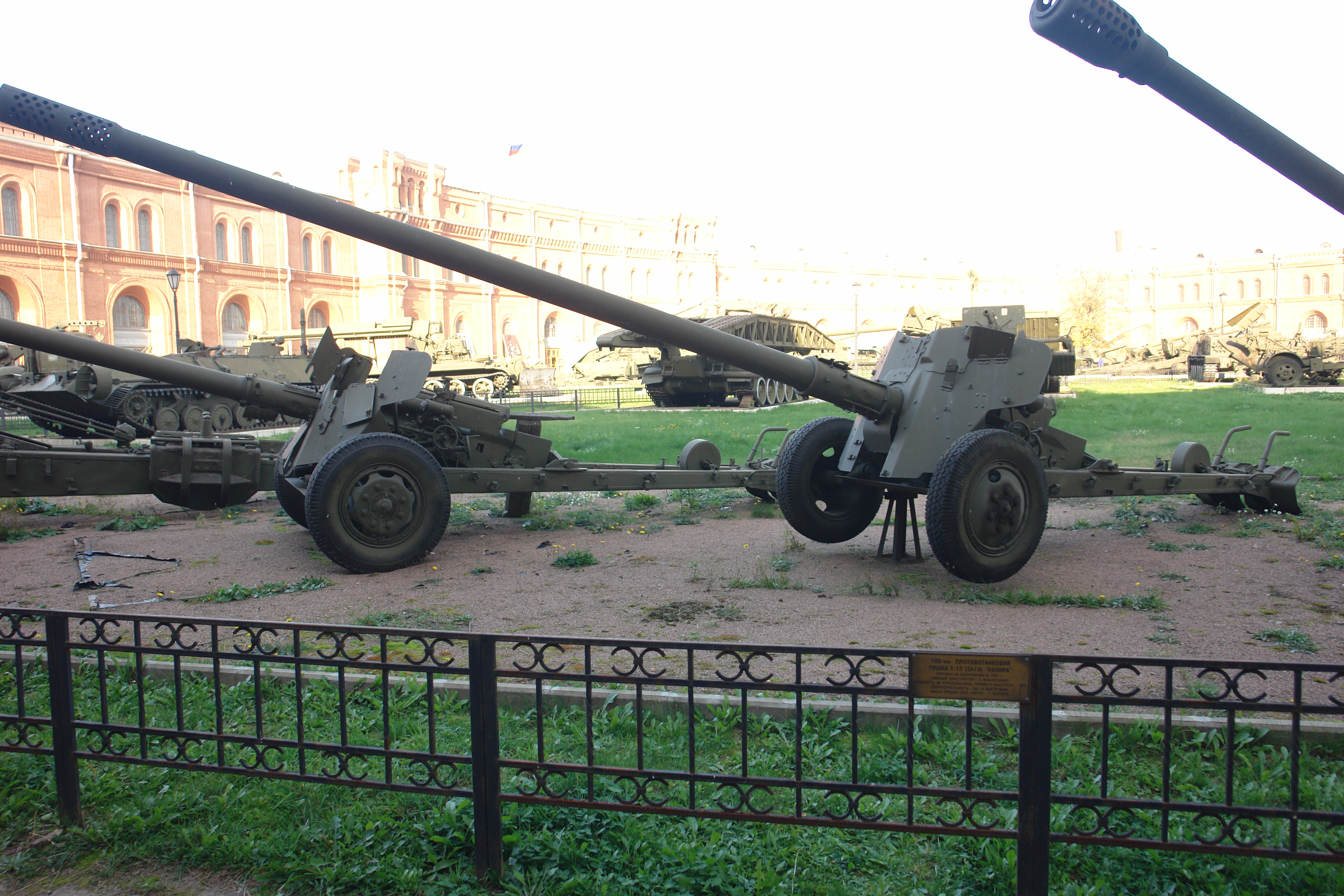
- T-12 displayed in the Artillery Museum in Saint Petersburg, Russia.
- Type: Anti-tank gun
- Place of origin: Soviet Union

Service history
- In service: 1961–present
- Used by: See Operators
- Wars: See Combat history

Specifications
- Mass: 2,750 kg (6,060 lb)
- Length: 9.16 m (30 ft 1 in)
- Barrel length: 6.3 m (20 ft 8 in) 63 calibers
- Width: 1.795 m (5 ft 11 in)
- Height: 1.565 m (5 ft 2 in)
- Crew: 6
- Shell: Fixed QF 100 × 910 mmR (R/147mm)
- Caliber: 100 millimetres (3.9 in)
- Recoil: Hydro-pneumatic
- Carriage: Transport: Ural-375D (6×6); On road: 60 km/h (37 mph); Off road: 15 km/h (9 mph)
- Elevation: −10° to +20°
- Traverse: 27° left or right
- Rate of fire: 14 rpm (max possible); 10 rpm (max likely); 4 to 6 rpm (typical)
- Muzzle velocity: See Ammunition
- Maximum firing range: See Ammunition

2A19 or T-12 is a Soviet-designed 100-mm anti-tank gun. It was the first anti-tank gun to adopt a smoothbore barrel, and to introduce modern armor piercing shot, like the APFSDS. It uses long projectiles that are more powerful than its caliber suggests. The T-12 served as the primary towed anti-tank artillery in the Soviet and Bulgarian armies from the early 1960s to the late 1980s.

== History ==
The T-12 was designed by the construction bureau of the Yurga Machine-Building Plant as a replacement for the BS-3 100 mm gun. The first serial examples were produced in 1955, but the T-12 entered service only in 1961. Its special feature was the use of a smoothbore gun. The T-12 was typically deployed in the anti-tank units of armored and motor rifle regiments to protect flanks against counter-attacks during rapid advances.

In 1971, a new variant was introduced, T-12A or MT-12 "Rapira" (2A29). This has the same barrel, but has a redesigned carriage and gun shield. This allows the MT-12 to be towed by the MT-LB, giving greater mobility. The 2A29R "Ruta" or MT-12R is an MT-12 version with a radar system. From 1981, the gun could fire the laser beam-riding guided missile 9M117 Kastet (weapon system 9K116) and carried the new designator 2A29K "Kastet" or MT-12K.

By the mid-1990s, modern western tanks' frontal armor protection could no longer be penetrated by a 100 mm gun. The 100 mm caliber ammunition had reached the limits of what could be achieved with it. For a static anti-tank that cannot move to attack the sides of an opponent this is particularly problematic. Today, the T-12 is used mostly in the role of ordinary artillery, using FRAG-HE shells. The T-12 was planned to be superseded by the 2A45 Sprut-B 125 mm smooth bore anti-tank gun.

== Description ==
=== A revolutionary smoothbore gun ===
On introduction, the T-12's gun differed from all existing artillery by employing a smoothbore barrel instead of a rifled one. The reasons to introduce a smoothbore barrel primarily relate to armor piercing shot. This kind of shot relies on mechanically penetrating armor. It is most effective if it has the form of a long narrow diameter rod fired at very high speed. In flight it can be stabilized by a rifled gun barrel having given it rotation when it was fired, but this becomes less effective if the projectile becomes longer. The T-12 gun overcame the stabilization problem by applying fins to the projectile. This started the replacement of the armour-piercing discarding sabot (APDS) fired by rifled guns by the armour-piercing fin-stabilized discarding sabot (APFSDS) shot fired by smoothbore guns.

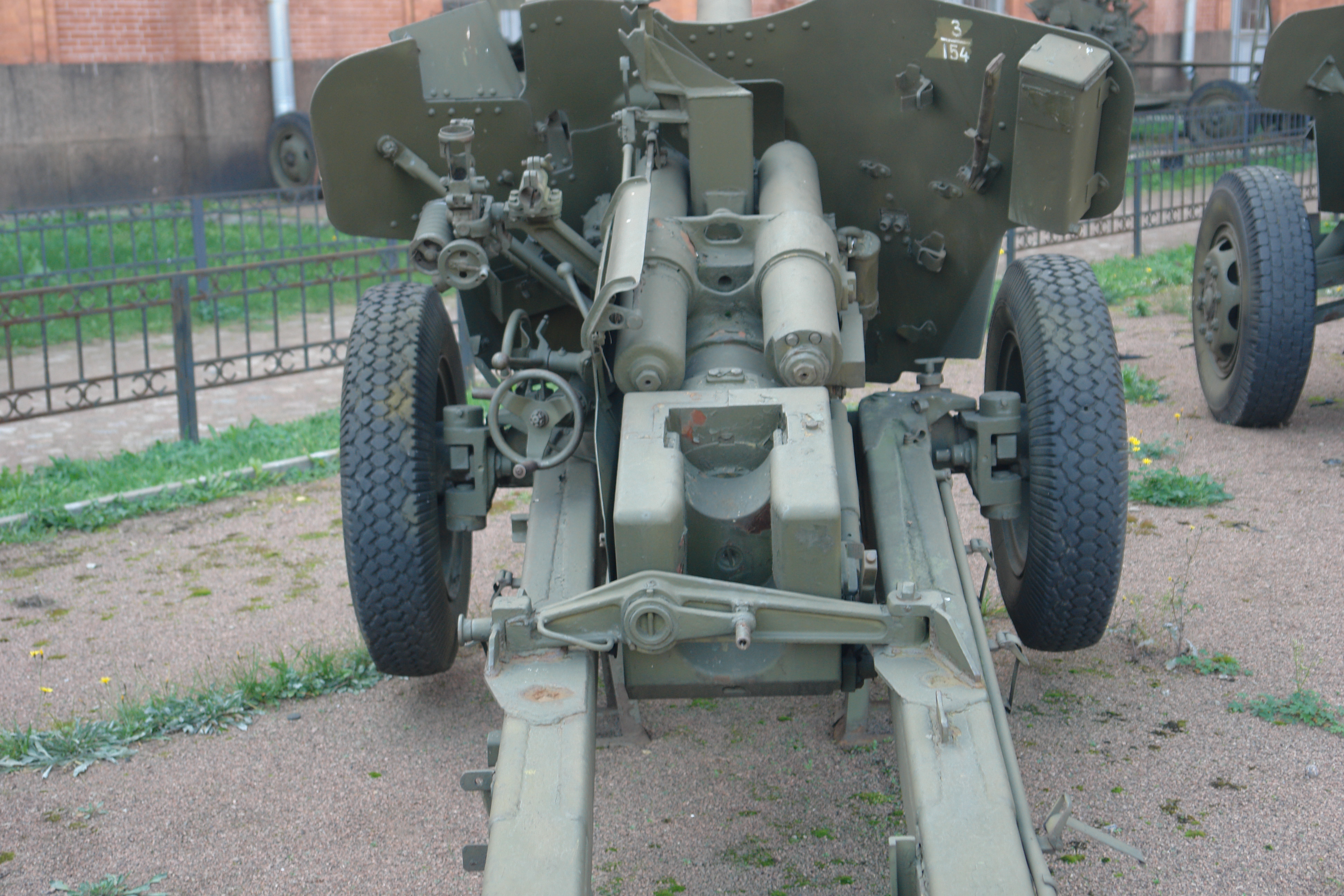
T-12 rear view showing only the two recoil tubes.

Another reason to use a smoothbore barrel for armor piercing shot, is that smoothbore guns allow for higher pressures, and thus higher projectile speeds. The result is that the T-12 fired a conspicuously long APFSDS projectile. This BM2 shot (see picture) had a diameter of 38 mm (1.5 in) and used 8.75 kg (19.3 lb) of propellant instead of less than 6 kg (13 lb) for the existing Soviet tank gun. It was fired at a muzzle velocity of 1,540 m/s (5,100 ft/s) as opposed to only 900 m/s (3,000 ft/s) for the usual armor piercing shot. At 1,000 m (3,300 ft) this improved armor penetration from 185 mm (7.3 in) to 230 mm (9.1 in), enough to penetrate most NATO tanks of the period.

High-explosive anti-tank (HEAT) shells do not rely on high speed to penetrate armor, but on the explosion of the projectile on impact. The problem of using a rifled gun to fire a HEAT shot was that the stabilizing spin degraded the penetrating power by as much as half. Combined with other challenges HEAT shots were not effective for tank guns by the mid-1950s. The T-12 overcame most problems by firing a HEAT shot that was stabilized by pop-out fins. However, it was still not ideal as it was slow and therefore had to be fired in a higher arc. This was complicated by the Soviet scarcity of good rangefinders.

In 1958 Nikita Khrushchev saw the T-12 and was so enthusiastic about the gun, that he wanted it placed in the T55. However, the long ammunition would not fit in the existing Soviet medium-tank turrets. Therefore, the 115 mm U-5TS gun of the T-62 was developed with a larger caliber, so it could use more propellant while not requiring the very long T-12 cartridges.

The T-12's breech is semi-automatic, meaning that it needs to be opened only before the first shot. After the first shot the breech opens by itself, so a new projectile can immediately be loaded.

=== Other charactertistics ===
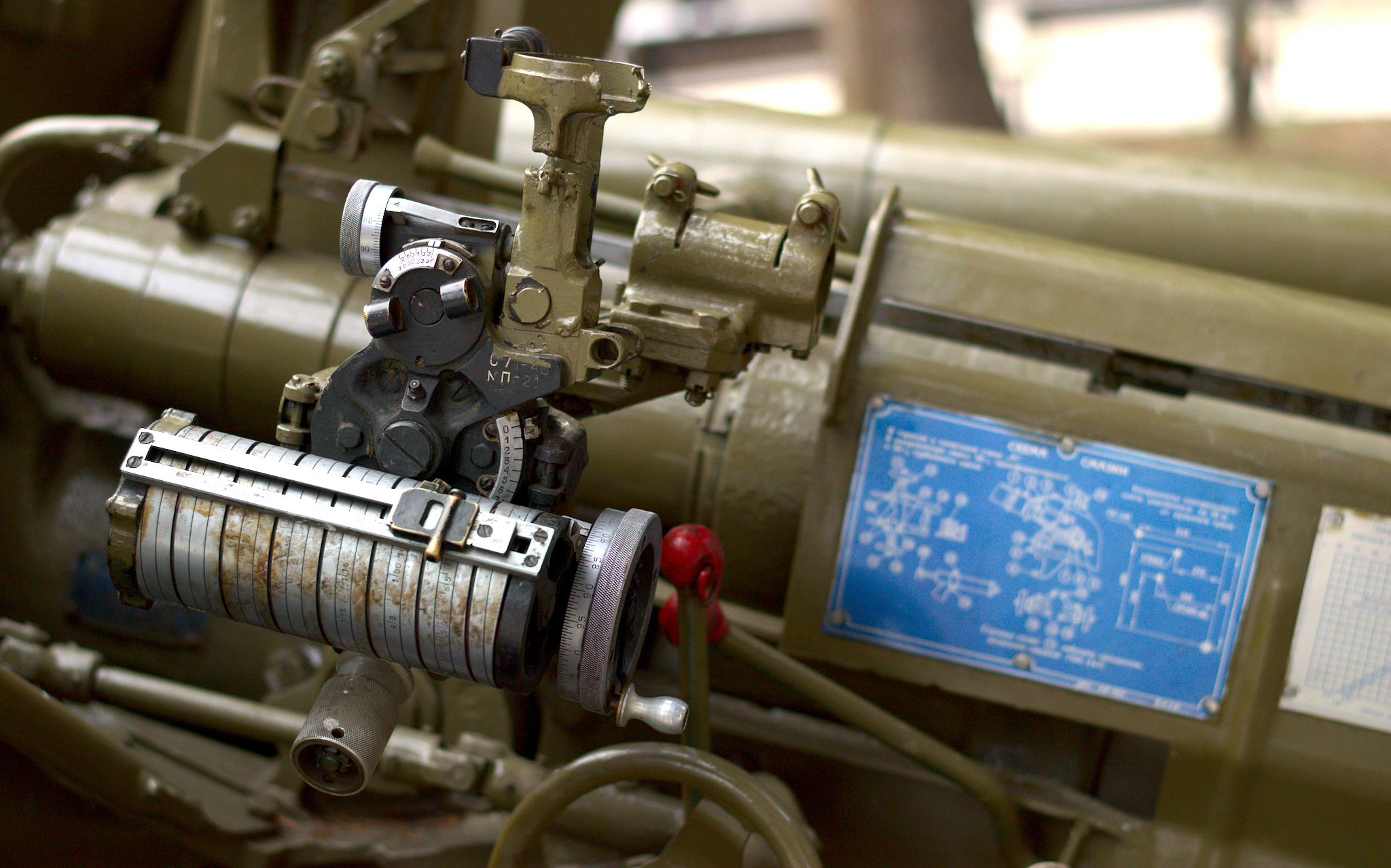
The mechanical S71-40 indirect aiming mechanism

The T-12 used the carriage of the 85 mm anti-tank gun D-48. In fact the only difference between the T-12 and the D-48 was the barrel. Both can be told apart by the muzzle brake, which becomes wider towards the end of the D-48's barrel, but has the same width throughout for the T-12 and MT-12. The wheels of both D-48 and T-12 are secured by six bolts. The carriage of the T-12 did not allow it to be towed cross-country by fast tracked vehicles. It was therefore usually towed by trucks. This limited the T-12's cross country movement to only 15 km/h (9.3 mph).

The gun can be fitted with the LO-7 ski gear for travel across snow or swampy ground. This is a metal welded structure with wide runners. The wheels are rolled up to the runners and fastened with a coupling chain. The gun can fire directly from the skis.

The principal difference between the upper part of the T-12 and that of the MT-12 is in the equilibrator that is used. That of the T-12 is hardly visible, whereas that of the MT-12 is a huge tube lying on top of the right rear part of the gun. Standing behind the gun, a barrel that has two short tubes on top of the gun barrel between the breech and the gun shield, is a T-12. If a third misaligned tube is present on the right side, the gun is an MT-12.

The gun requires a crew of six: commander, driver of the towing vehicle, gun layer, loader, and two ammunition crewmen. Since the weapon is a smoothbore, all the ammunition is finned for accuracy during flight.

The standard equipment of the T-12 includes multiple sights. The indirect aiming mechanism consists of the S71-40 mechanism with panoramic PG-1M sight. The OP4M-40U sight is used for direct fire. The APN-5-40 or APN-6-40 are used for direct fire by night.

== Ammunition ==
Note: penetration numbers for RHA at 90 degrees.

=== APFSDS ===
BM-2 APFSDS projectile.

3BM-2

APFSDS-T Tungsten

- Round weight: 19.34 kg (42.6 lb)
- Projectile weight: 5.65 kg (12.5 lb)
- Muzzle velocity: 1,575 m/s (5,170 ft/s)
- Maximum range: 3,000 m (3,300 yd)
- Penetration:
  - 230 mm at 500 m (9 in at 550 yd)
  - 180 mm at 2,000 m (7 in at 2,200 yd)
  - 140 mm at 3,000 m (5.5 in at 3,300 yd)

3BM23/3UBM10

APFSDS

- Round weight: 19.9 kg (44 lb)
- Projectile weight: 4.55 kg (10.0 lb)
- Muzzle velocity: 1,548 m/s (5,080 ft/s)
- Maximum range: 3,000 m (3,300 yd)
- Penetration: 225 mm at 1000 m (8.8 in at 1100 yd)

=== HEAT ===
3BK16M/3UBK8

- Round weight: 23.1 kg (51 lb)
- Projectile weight: 9.5 kg (21 lb)
- Muzzle velocity: 975 m/s (3,200 ft/s)
- Maximum range: 1,000 m (1,100 yd)
- Penetration: 400 mm (16 in)

=== HE-FRAG ===
3OF12/3OF35

- Round weight: 28.9 kg (64 lb)
- Projectile weight: 16.7 kg (37 lb)
- Muzzle velocity: 700 m/s (2,300 ft/s)
- Maximum range (indirect): 8,200 m (9,000 yd)

=== Guided projectile ===
9K117 Kastet 3UBK10/3UBK10M

Beam riding laser guided projectile.

- Round weight: 24.5 kg (54 lb)
- Projectile weight: 17.6 kg (39 lb)
- Average speed: 300 m/s (980 ft/s)
- Range: 100–5,000 m (110–5,470 yd)
- Penetration: 550–600 mm (22–24 in)

== Operators ==
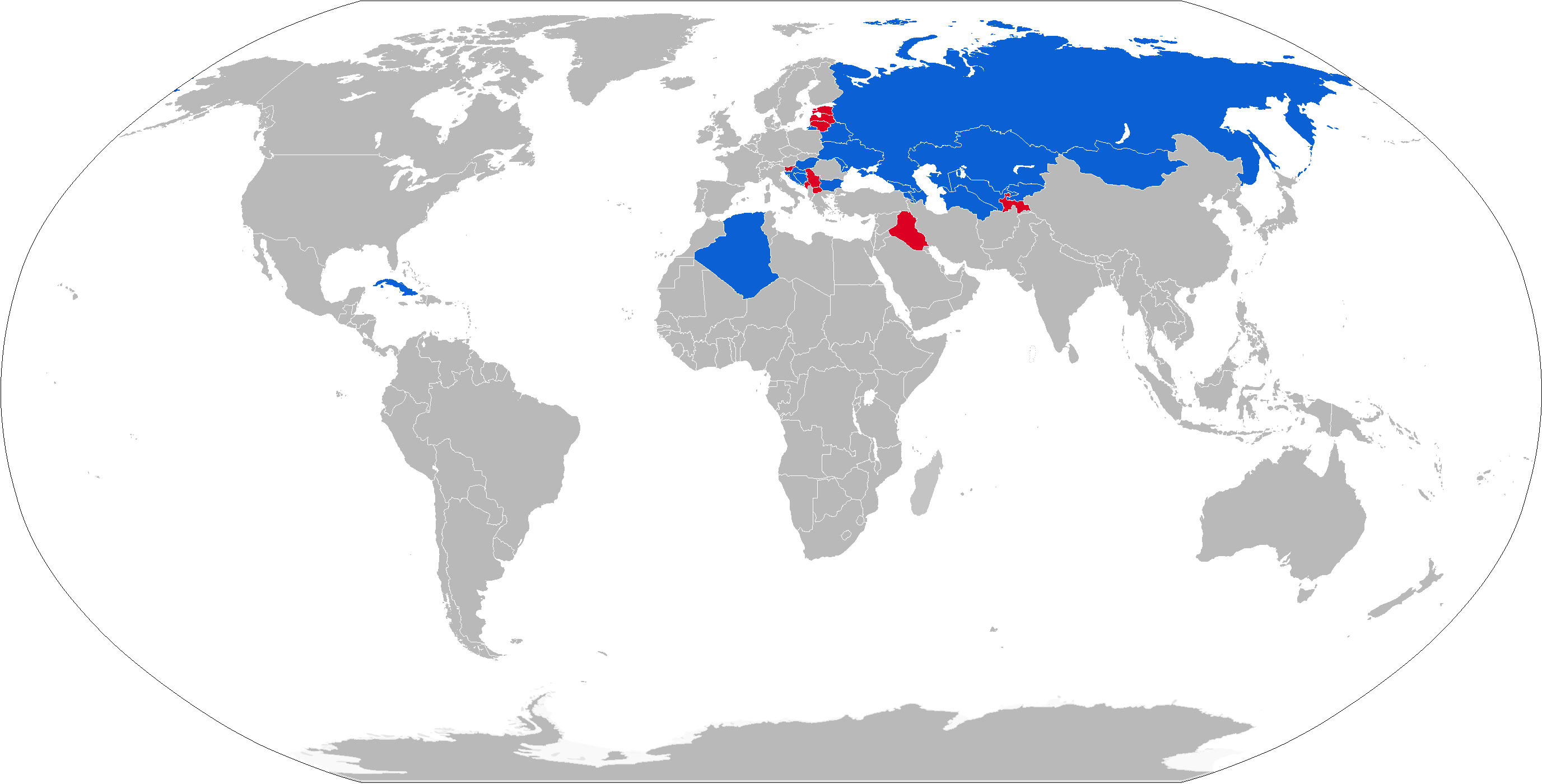
Map of T-12 operators in blue with former operators in red

- Algeria: 10
- Bulgaria: 126
- Cambodia: 80
- Georgia: 16
- Kazakhstan: 68
- Kyrgyzstan: 18
- Mali
- Moldova: 37
- Russia
- Syria: 20+
- Transnistria
- Turkmenistan: 60
- Ukraine: 500
- Uzbekistan: 36
- Vietnam

=== Former operators ===
- Armenia
- Bosnia and Herzegovina
- Cuba
- East Germany: 267
- Egypt: 100
- Ethiopia: 50
- Hungary
- Iraq: 100
- People's Republic of Kampuchea: 15
- Mongolia: 25
- Somalia: 25
- South Yemen: 72
- Soviet Union
- Yugoslavia: 350

== Combat history ==
=== Russo-Ukrainian War ===
During the War in Donbas (2014–2022), the Ukrainian army had 500 anti tank guns of the types T-12, MT-12 and MT-12R. Reports about the gun often do not properly discern T-12 from MT-12. During the war in Donbas, the use of the MT-12 was documented on many pictures. The use of the T-12 is less certain.

Ukrainian forces in the Russian invasion of Ukraine, were also observed using the MT-12. The old T-12 was not sighted that often. However, in January 2023, the BBC published an article and video showing the use of a T-12 by Ukrainian forces near Bakhmut.

On the Russian side, the T-12 seems not to have been used before 2023. In early 2023 a T-12 was first sighted towed by a truck in Crimea in early 2023, but that does not indicate actual combat use. During the May 2023 Belgorod Oblast attack it was confirmed on the front line, because a piece was destroyed together with some trucks.

=== Second Nagorno-Karabakh War ===
During the Second Nagorno-Karabakh War (2020), the T-12 was used on the Armenian side.

=== Other conflicts ===
Incomplete, and still requiring thorough check whether T-12 or MT-12 was used:

- Soviet–Afghan War
- Iran–Iraq War
- Persian Gulf War
- War of Dagestan
- Russo-Georgian War
- Syrian civil war

== Variants ==
=== MT-LB-12 (Ukraine) ===
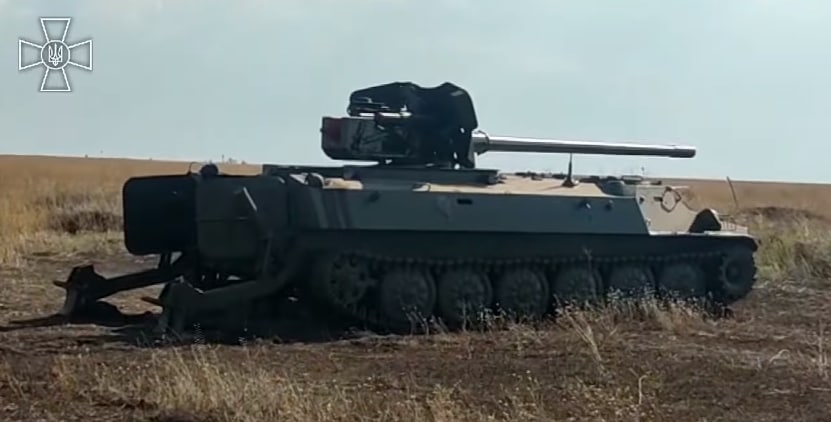
Ukraine's first self propelled T-12

In August 2022, videos of a Ukrainian T-12 mounted on top of an MT-LB began to circulate online. This first video showed a combination which had a hydraulic stabilization mechanism behind its tracks. The conversion had been done by local infantrymen. It was soon followed by a second combination which did not have a hydraulic stabilization mechanism behind its tracks.

While the combinations were widely reported as mounting an MT-12, the publications consistently showed characteristics of a T-12 being mounted. In the video of the first combination, the gun itself clearly did not have the equilibrator which is unique to the MT-12. Pictures of the second combination also did not have an equilibrator, and the reporting of its manufacture even showed a picture of a complete towed T-12 gun, recognizable by its 6-bolted wheels.

It is nevertheless quite possible that Ukraine might one day mount an MT-12 on the MT-LB chassis. The combination has been dubbed as MT-LB-12.

=== Romania ===
- A407 - This artillery system was designed by Arsenal-Resita and is very similar to the MT-12. It can fire the same range of ammunition as the T-54/55 tank and has a maximum range of 2,200 m (7,200 ft) (HEAT) or 4,000 m (13,000 ft) (APC-T). Subversions are the A407M1 and the A407M2. In Romanian Army service, the A407 is known as the 100 mm anti-tank gun M1977 (Romanian: Tun antitanc calibrul 100-mm Model 1977) and is normally towed by the DAC 887R truck. It can also be towed with the DAC 665T truck. The Model 2002 is an improved version, fitted with the automatic fire control system TAT-100.

=== People's Republic of China ===
- Type 73 - This appears to be a copy of the Soviet T-12.
- Type 86 - This is a 100mm smoothbore anti-tank gun that has some similarities with the 85mm Type 56 (D-44). It fires ammunition of the fixed type, including the Type 73 HE, Type 73 HEAT, Type 73 APFSDS and Type 86 APFSDS to a maximum range of 1,800 m (5,900 ft).

== See also ==
- List of anti-tank guns
- List of military equipment of Croatia
- List of artillery of the Soviet Union and Russia
