= MT-12 =

MT-12 (2A29) 100 mm anti-tank gun
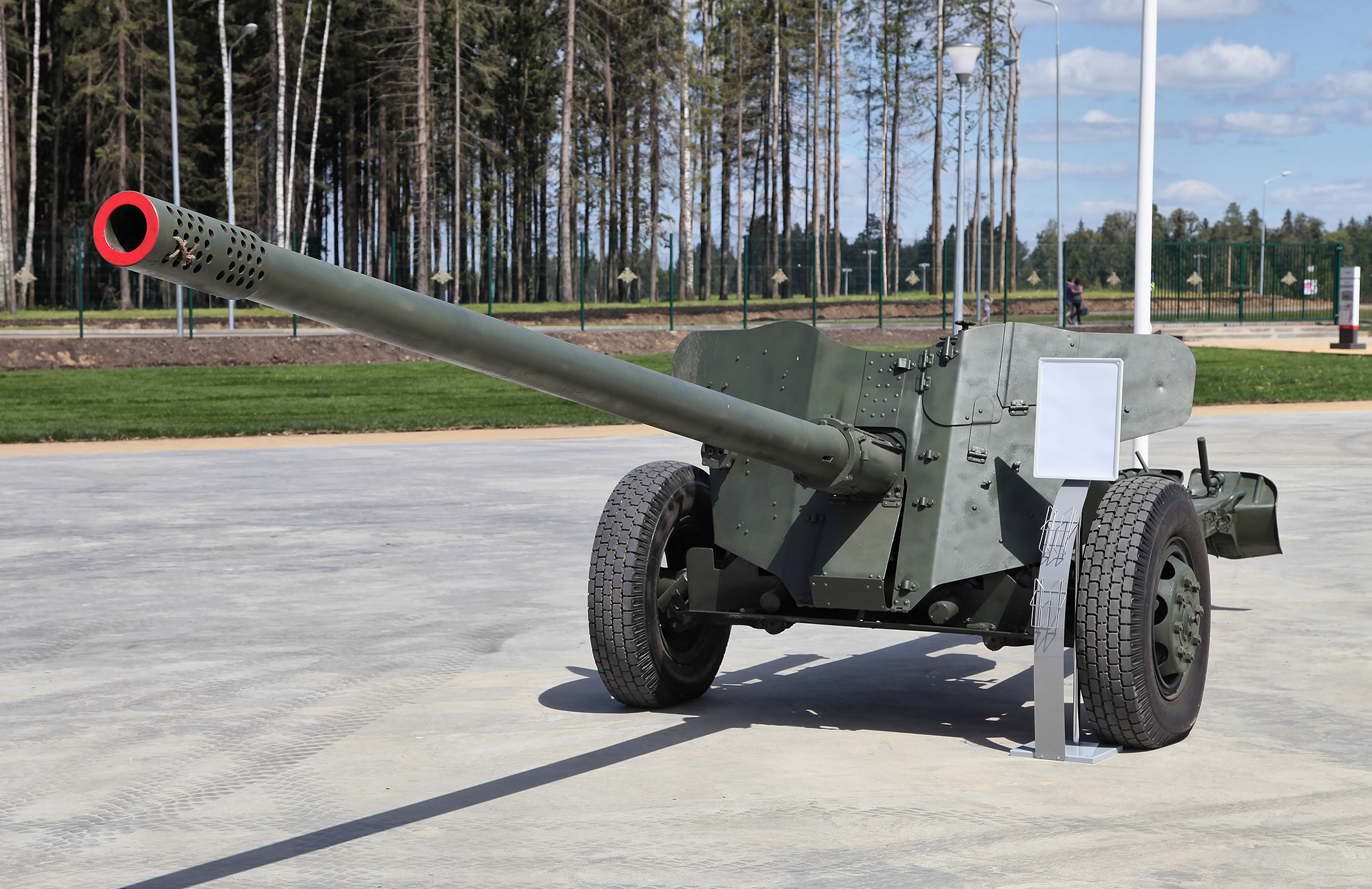
- MT-12 displayed at Patriot Park, Russia.
- Type: Anti-tank gun
- Place of origin: Soviet Union

Service history
- In service: 1970–present
- Used by: See Operators
- Wars: See Wars

Specifications
- Mass: 3,050 kg (6,720 lb)
- Length: 9.65 m (31 ft 8 in)
- Barrel length: 6.3 m (20 ft 8 in) 63 calibers
- Width: 2.32 m (7 ft 7 in)
- Height: 1.6 m (5 ft 3 in)
- Crew: 7
- Shell: 100 × 910 mmR
- Caliber: 100 mm (3.9 in)
- Recoil: Hydro-pneumatic
- Carriage: Transport: MT-LB On road: 70 km/h (43 mph) Off road: 25 km/h (16 mph)
- Elevation: −6° to +20°
- Traverse: 27° left or right
- Rate of fire: 6-14 rpm
- Muzzle velocity: 700–1,575 m/s (2,300–5,170 ft/s)
- Maximum firing range: 3,000 m (9,800 ft) (direct); 8,200 m (26,900 ft) (indirect)

MT-12 or 2A29 is a Soviet smoothbore 100 mm anti-tank gun, which served as the primary towed anti-tank artillery in the Soviet army from the early 1970s to the late 1980s. It has seen significant use in the Russo-Ukrainian War.

== History ==
The 100 mm anti-tank gun T-12, which had entered service in 1961, proved very successful. Its shortcomings had to do with its use of the carriage of the 85 mm anti-tank gun D-48. This was so narrow that the T-12 was prone to topple over its side and could only be towed through the terrain at 15 km/h. Also, the equilibrator had to be redesigned, as described below. Together with some lesser considerations, this led to the development of the T-12A, later known as MT-12, GRAU-index 2A29.

== Characteristics ==
=== Carriage ===
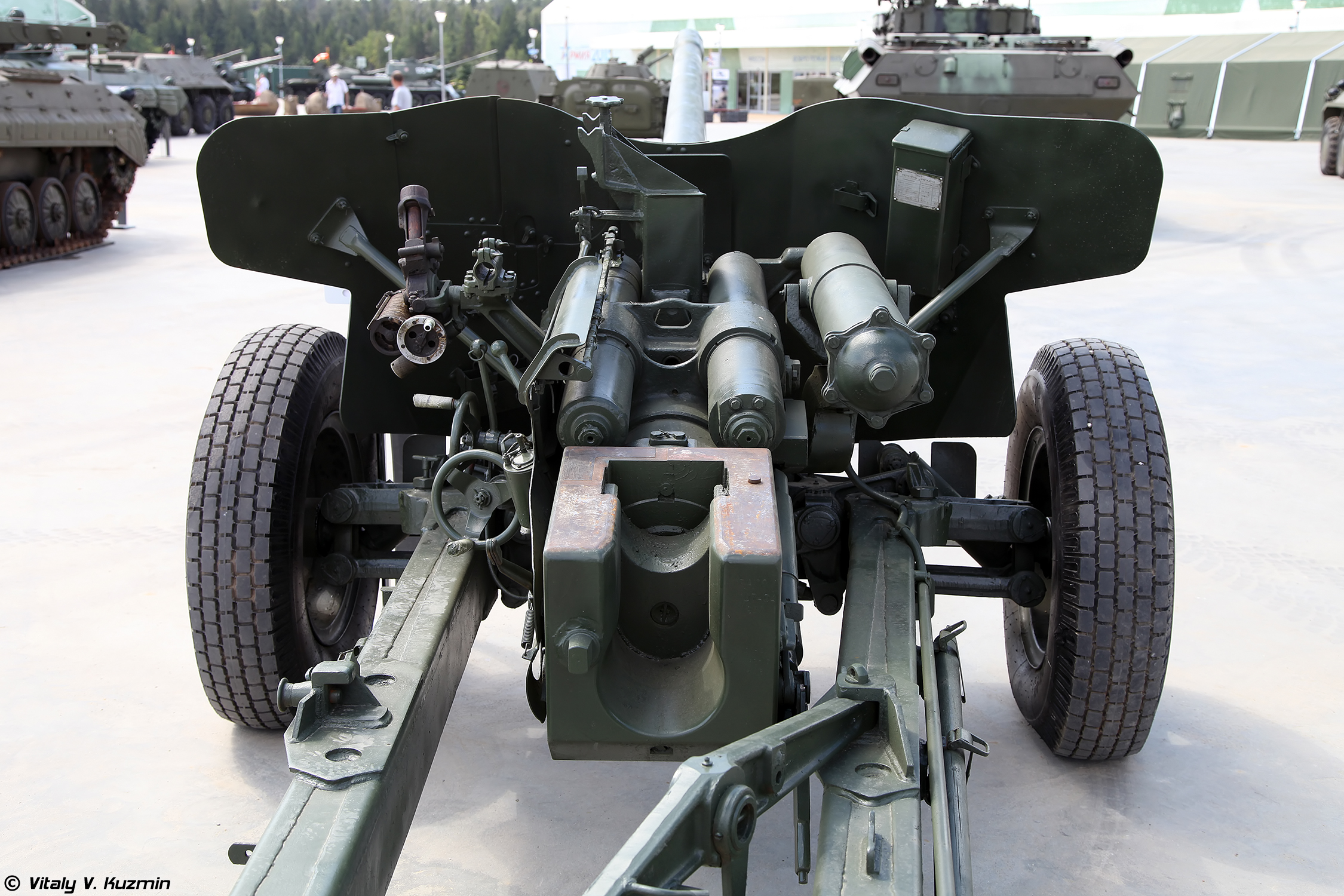
Rear view with equilibrator

The carriage is the main difference between the MT-12 and the T-12. Its track width is 1.91 m instead of only 1.465 m, and it has a more robust suspension. This allows the MT-12 to be also towed by the tracked MT-LB, instead of only by a truck. The conditions in Russia itself, with few roads and a terrain that turns to mud at least once a year, explain how important tracked movement is.

The new carriage also allowed the MT-12 to be towed through the terrain at 25 km/h instead of only 15 km/h. On the left arm of the carriage is a castering wheel which can be unfolded. It allows the 7-men crew to manhandle the 3,000 kg gun over short distances without the use of a towing vehicle.

The equilibrator of the MT-12 differs from that of the T-12. An equilibrator serves to keep the gun in balance, even while the barrel weight on both sides of the trunnion differs. This allows easy elevation of the gun barrel. The MT-12 uses a very prominent coil spring equilibrator. Standing behind the gun, the barrel has a single tube above it in the same position on each side, running almost from the shield to the breech block. These two tubes are part of the recoil system. Above the right tube is another tube at a slightly different horizontal angle, this is the equilibrator. It is a heavy and bulky thing compared to the much smaller pneumatic equilibrator of the T-12, but is also more reliable and user-friendly. On the rear view, the equilibrator has a lid with six bolts at its end. It presence allows easy discrimination between the T-12 and the MT-12.

In order to accommodate the larger weight of the MT-12, its carriage has bigger wheels. These are the same as those of the ZiL-150 truck. The wheels are also helpful to tell T-12 and MT-12 apart. That of the T-12 is secured by six bolts. The wheel of the MT-12 is secured by eight bolts.

=== The 100 mm 2A29 gun ===
The 100 mm caliber gun has a 6,300 mm long barrel. The chamber is 915 mm long. The end of the barrel is strengthened and has 80 holes. It serves as a muzzle brake. The semi-automatic breech block system consists of opening and closing cylinders and a transfer system. The breech block has a safety system that prevents the gun from firing if the breech is not completely closed. Together with cartridge ammunition the semi-automatic loading system results in a high rate of fire of up to 14 rounds per minute.

=== Optics and aiming ===
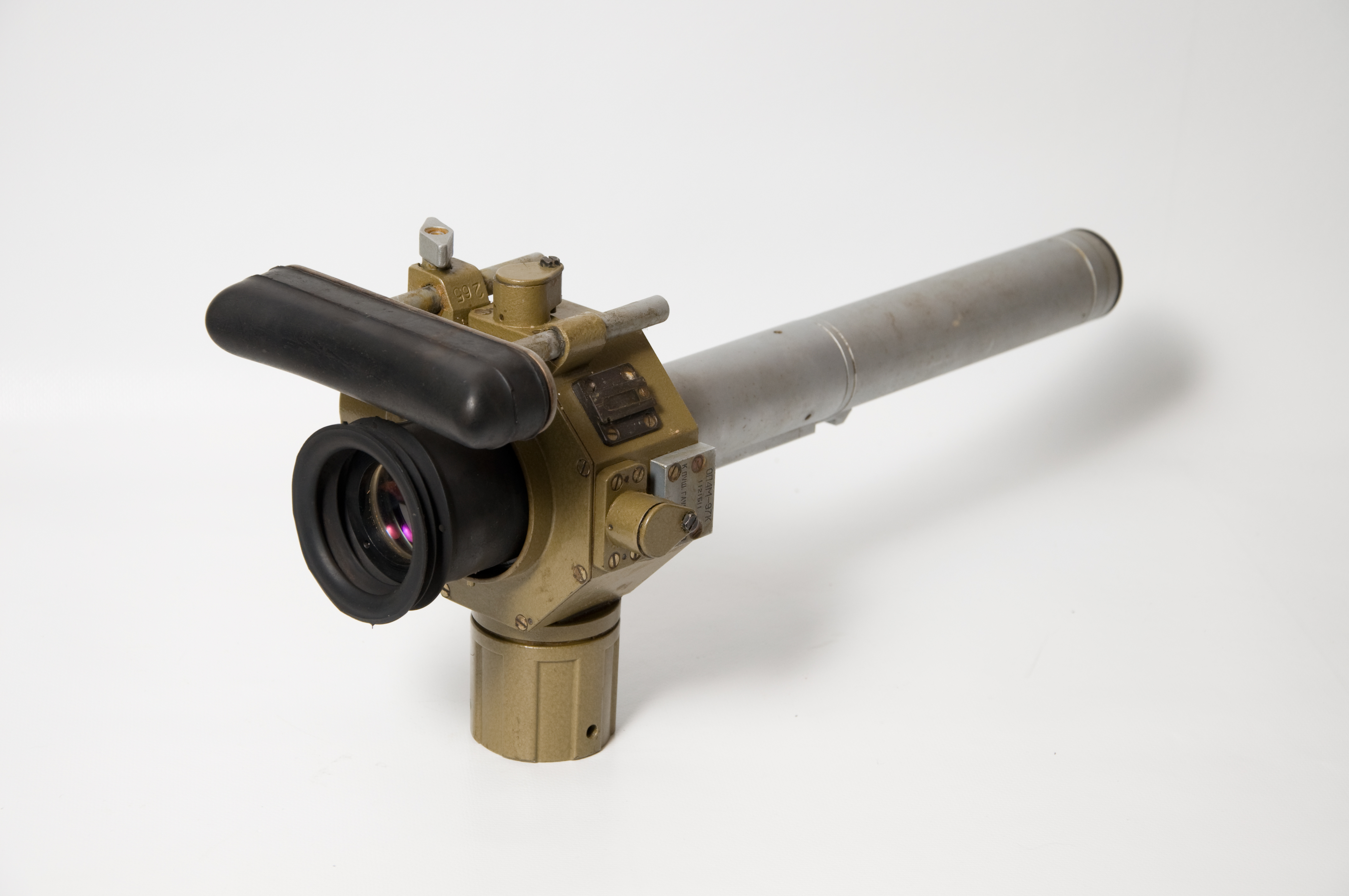
OP4M sight

The MT-12 has multiple sights, which can all be installed at the same time. The gun shield has three panels which can be folded away to allow usage of one of the sights, or remain closed when that sight is not needed. When the enemy is still at distance, the crew might open all three observation panels of the shield to allow use of the panoramic periscope sight of the S71-40 mount. This allows the gunner to scan for targets. While doing so, the gun-shield still protects his body. Only the part of his head protected by his helmet gets exposed.

In close combat only the small vertical panel that forms a loophole for direct fire observation is opened. Behind it, the OP4M-40U sight is mounted. This has a 5.5 times magnification and an angle of view of 11 degrees. Closing the other panels allows the crew to move behind the shield without risk of getting hit by small arms fire from enemy infantry or tanks.

The gun also has a passive night sight. At first this was the APN-5-40, later the APN-6-40 known as Brusnika (Cranberry). As these do not use power, these are very big and vulnerable devices. They were therefore dismounted before transport, and only attached to the gun before dusk if the gun was in position. The MT-12 can also use other night sights, like the 1PN35, 1PN53, or APN-7.

For indirect fire aiming, the MT-12 is equipped with the S71-40 mechanical artillery sight, PG-1M panoramic telescope and the K-1 collimator sight.

== Ammunition ==
=== Anti-tank shot ===
Against tanks, the MT-12 can fire armour-piercing fin-stabilized discarding sabot (APFSDS) and high-explosive anti-tank (HEAT) rounds. The HEAT shot has more penetration, but can easily be defeated by measures like reactive armour and composite armour. The APFSDS round relies on a (high) terminal velocity at impact and after that on its length. This makes the APFSDS directly dependent on the power of the gun that fires it.

By the mid-1990s modern tanks had a frontal armor protection of between 800 and 900 mm of rolled homogeneous armor (RHA). With the ammunition then at its disposal, the MT-12 could not expect to penetrate such armor. In this respect, the 100 mm caliber gun had reached its physical limits.

=== Gun-launched anti-tank missile ===
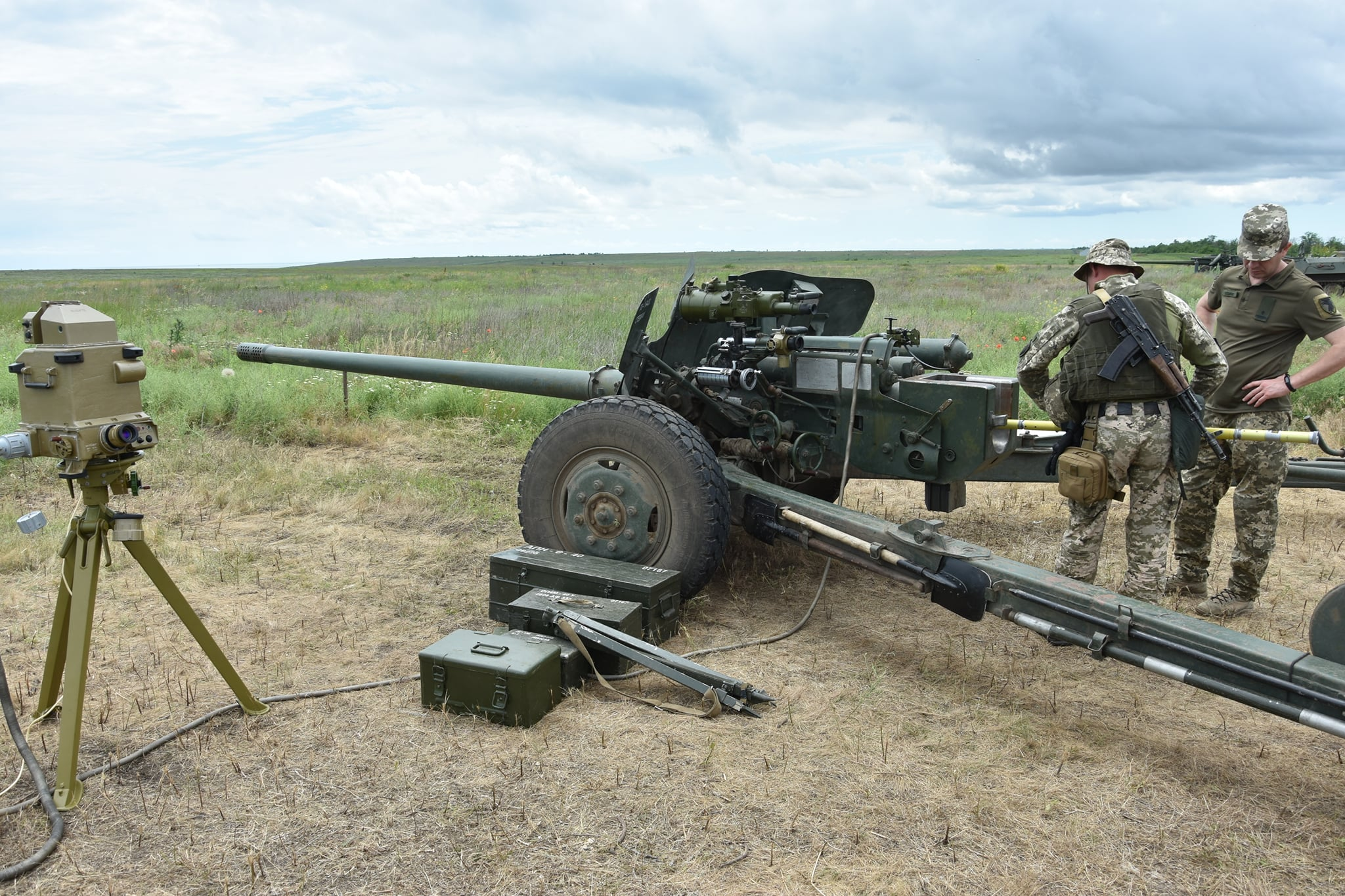
The MT-12K gun configured with laser designator for targeting with the 9M117 Bastion gun-launched anti-tank guided missile.

In 1981 the 9K116 Kastet laser-guided, anti-tank missile system entered service. The system, or kompleks as per Soviet doctrine, consisted of the missile within its fixed case ammunition, and a separate guidance unit. The initial 3UBK10 round saw the laser guided 9M117 Bastion anti-tank missile inserted in a case with a reduced powder charge.

Upon firing, the missile is ejected through the gun, leaving the bore with a muzzle velocity of 450 m/s. 1.5 seconds after exiting the muzzle, the rocket motor ignites, the speed being reduced to some 300 m/s at its maximum range. The missile approaches the target riding its guidance laser, the designation unit of which is mounted on a separate tripod.

By the mid-1990s, the Kastet was no longer able to defeat the frontal armor of modern tanks, and upgrades were performed to increase its capability, as can be seen from the claimed armor penetration of the initial missile variant and its later upgrades:

- 3UBK10, 9M117 Bastion missile. Claimed average armor penetration of 550 mm rolled homogeneous armour equivalency (RHAe) after ERA
- 3UBK10M, 9M117M Kan Tandem HEAT missile. Claimed average armor penetration of 600 mm RHAe after ERA
- 3UBK23, 9M117M1 (Russian) Arkan Tandem HEAT missile with extended range of 6,000 m. Claimed average armor penetration of 750 mm 550 mm RHAe after ERA
- The Stugna or Skif (Ukrainian) portable ATGM fires a 130 mm rocket, but also has a 100 mm gun-launched variant. This has a claimed range of range of 5,000 m, and a claimed average armor penetration of not less than 550 mm RHAe after ERA.

=== Shot against soft targets ===
The MT-12 also fires High Explosive (HE) shells. These are an absolute necessity for an anti tank gun to defend itself against enemy infantry. For combat in general, the HE-shells can be used to combat enemy infantry and soft targets like trucks or enemy artillery.

=== Default ammunition stock ===
The default ammunition stock of the MT-12 when towed by the MT-LB was twenty rounds. These were ten solid armor-piercing rounds (BPS), six HEAT shaped-charge rounds (KS) and four high-explosive grenades (OFS) for use against “soft” targets.

== Variants ==
=== MT-12K ===
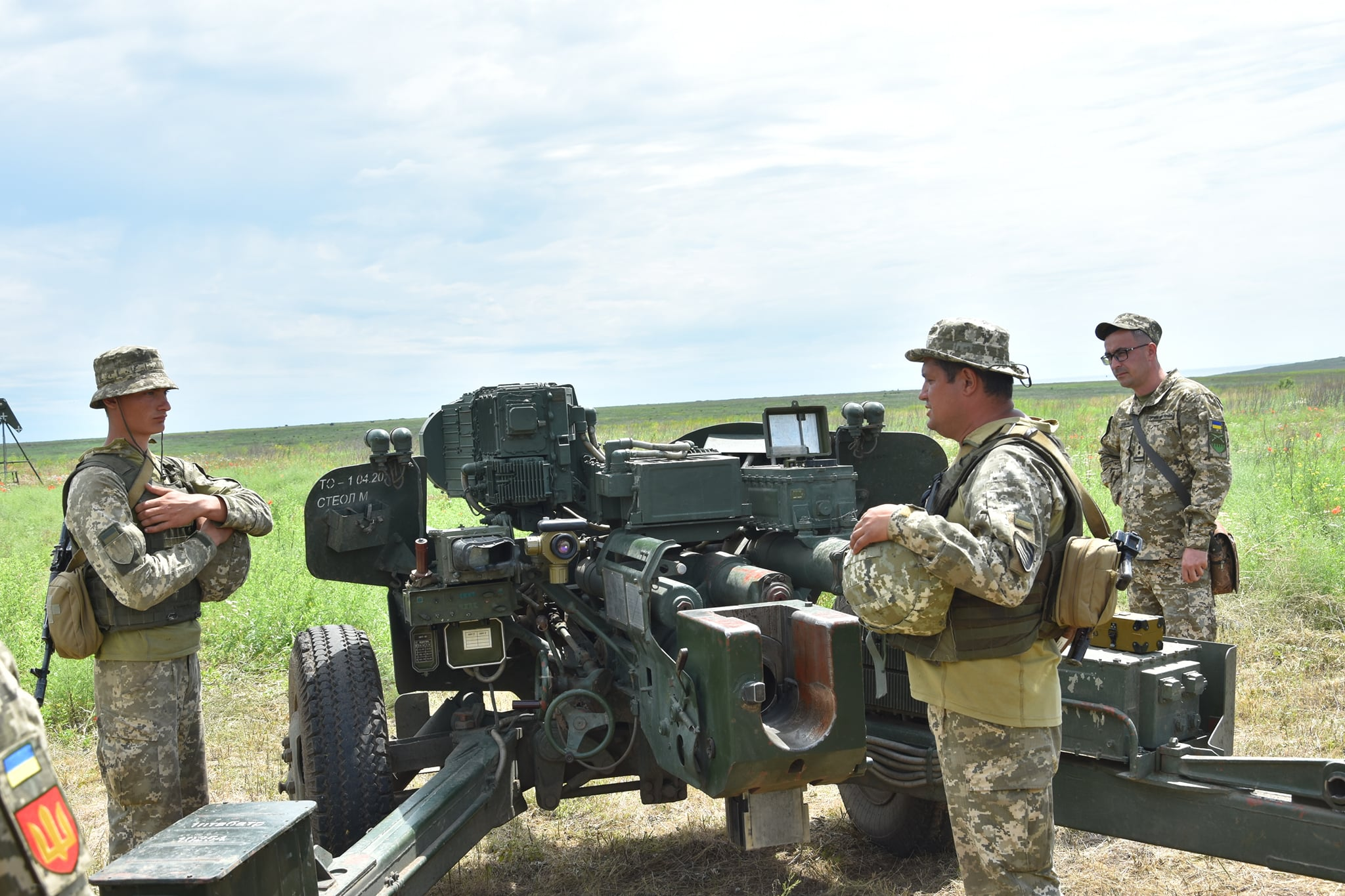
Ukrainian MT-12R with 1A31 radar sight in June 2021

The MT-12K, or 2A29K has a laser device for guiding the 9M117 missile shot fired by the 9K116 Kastet system, see above. It is not clear whether simply adding the separate tripod mounted guiding device turns an MT-12 into an MT-12K. The MT-12K was not exported by the Soviet Union.

=== MT-12R ===
The MT-12R or 2A29R was taken into service from 1981 to 1990. It has the small 1A31 Ruta radar fire control system. This does automatic target detection, range finding, tracking and engagement at distances up to 3,500 m. It enables the gun to quickly find and hit targets at night, and in other conditions of poor or no visibility. The MT-12R was not exported by the Soviet Union.

=== Self propelled variant ===
In Ukraine, a self-propelled variant of the MT-12 mounted on an MT-LB has been reported. Inspection of the footage shows that the first such conversion made by locals, used a T-12, not an MT-12. The gun mask (shield part below the gun) is that of a T-12. Furthermore, the videos do not show the big MT-12 equilibrator on the gun. A later version made by Ukrtransgazu also shows no such equilibrator, but two more specimens might use the MT-12.

=== Algerian MT-12 on truck ===
In 2017, the Algerian military displayed a locally developed variant mounting an MT-12 on a Mercedes-Benz Zetros truck. It includes four stabilization legs to absorb firing impacts.

== Use ==
=== Intended use ===
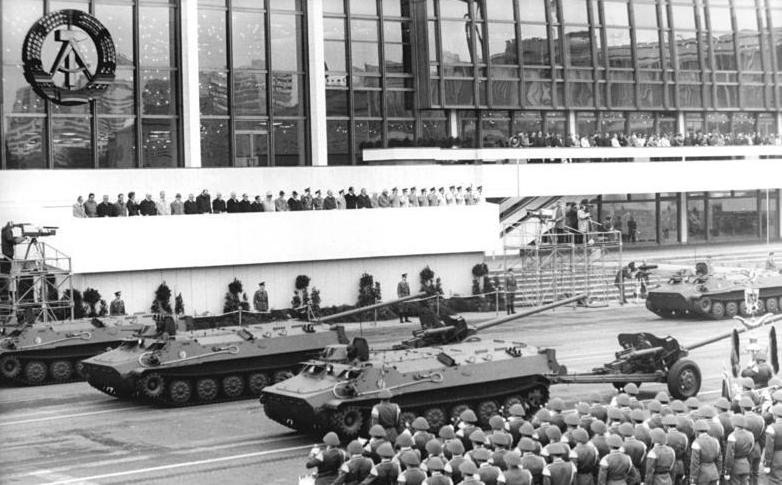
In East Germany, 1978

In the Soviet Union the MT-12 entered production in 1970. Just like the T-12, the MT-12 was used in anti-tank battalions of 18 guns, divided in 3 batteries of 6 guns each. This was the organizational structure for these guns during the entirety of the Cold War. However, if enough missile tank destroyers were available, one of the batteries would be replaced by one of 9 anti-tank guided missile platforms (ATGM).

During the Cold War the Soviet Union thought of the MT-12 as a defensive and expendable weapon. It was cost-effective, meaning that a lot of them could be produced and deployed. It could be entrenched, and due to its low height, it could easily be concealed to strike from a short distance. This use was intended to free up tanks and self-propelled guns for more important duties.

At the time that the MT-12 and its predecessor the T-12 entered service the capability to fire HE-shells was common to most anti-tank guns. These HE shells could be used in direct fire and in indirect fire. In the latter, the MT-12 serves as an artillery weapon. However, the limited elevation of the MT-12 of only 20 degrees limits its range as an artillery weapon. This is only about 8.2 km.

=== Use in 2014-2015 ===
The use of the MT-12 and other towed anti-tank guns has been studied in some detail for the War in Donbas up to 2017. In the Donbas, the T-64 was the most common tank. The MT-12 can penetrate its frontal armor at shorter distances. However, before the front lines stabilized after the Ukrainian defeat in the August–September 2014 Battle of Ilovaisk, the MT-12 was rarely seen, because maneuverable warfare prevented its wide employment. From September 2014 to February 2015 it then played a significant role. It was seen on both sides during the January–February 2015 Battle of Debaltseve. The final 2017 conclusion about the towed anti-tank gun was that: 'Moreover, its ability to be used in indirect fire makes the weapon ideally suited for the prolonged positional warfare that dominates the last two years of the Ukrainian conflict.

=== Current use in 2022-2023 ===
At the start of the 2022 Russian invasion of Ukraine, the Ukrainian Army still used both MT-12 and MT-12R, and the Russian proxies still used the MT-12.

On the Ukrainian side, the Territorial Defense brigades, composed of local volunteers, have been issued MT-12 guns. The MT-12 might give these reserve units a chance against Russian armor. However, it seems that while the first line units of the Ukrainian army use rocket artillery in direct fire, and the 2S1 Gvozdika in indirect fire, the MT-12 does both for the territorial defense units. The indirect fire capability was already significant in 2017. A video of the national guard firing the gun in actual combat indeed shows it being used at near maximum elevation. All this shows that in practice, the MT-12 is now widely used as a support gun. This was also reported about the self propelled variant, which has been given an increased elevation.

On the Russian side, a train load of MT-12s was pulled from storage and sent to the front in March 2023. Russia was expected to use these to increase artillery availability on the front. In mid-April two MT-12s were observed and destroyed while in an anti tank position.

== Operators ==
Incomplete list of MT-12 operators:

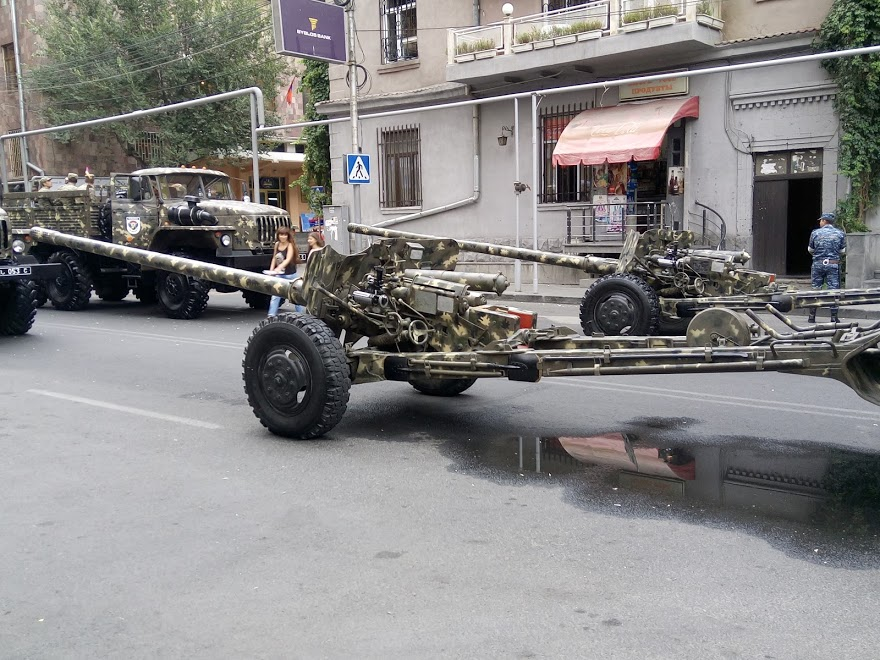
Armenian Army MT-12 in Yerevan

- Armenia:
- Vietnam:unknown quantity
- Bulgaria: 126 in 2021
- Hungary in the 1990s
- Kazakhstan: 20 in 2021
- Kyrgyzstan: 18 T-12/MT-12 in 2021
- Moldova: 31 in 2021
- Mongolia: ? T-12/MT-12 in 2021
- Russia: 526 in 2021, with a further 2,000 T-12/MT-12 in storage
- Turkmenistan: 60 T-12/MT-12 in 2021
- Ukraine: c. 500 T-12/MT-12 in 2021
  - Donetsk People's Republic: ? MT-12 in 2021
  - Luhansk People's Republic: ? MT-12 in 2021
- Uzbekistan: 60 T-12/MT-12 in 2021

=== Former operators ===
- East Germany
- Iraq
- Soviet Union
- Yugoslavia

== Wars ==
The MT-12 has served in many conflicts:

- Soviet–Afghan War (1979–1989)
- Persian Gulf War (1990–1991)
- Transnistria War (1990–1992)
- Russo-Ukrainian War (2014–present)
