= 2B9 Vasilek =

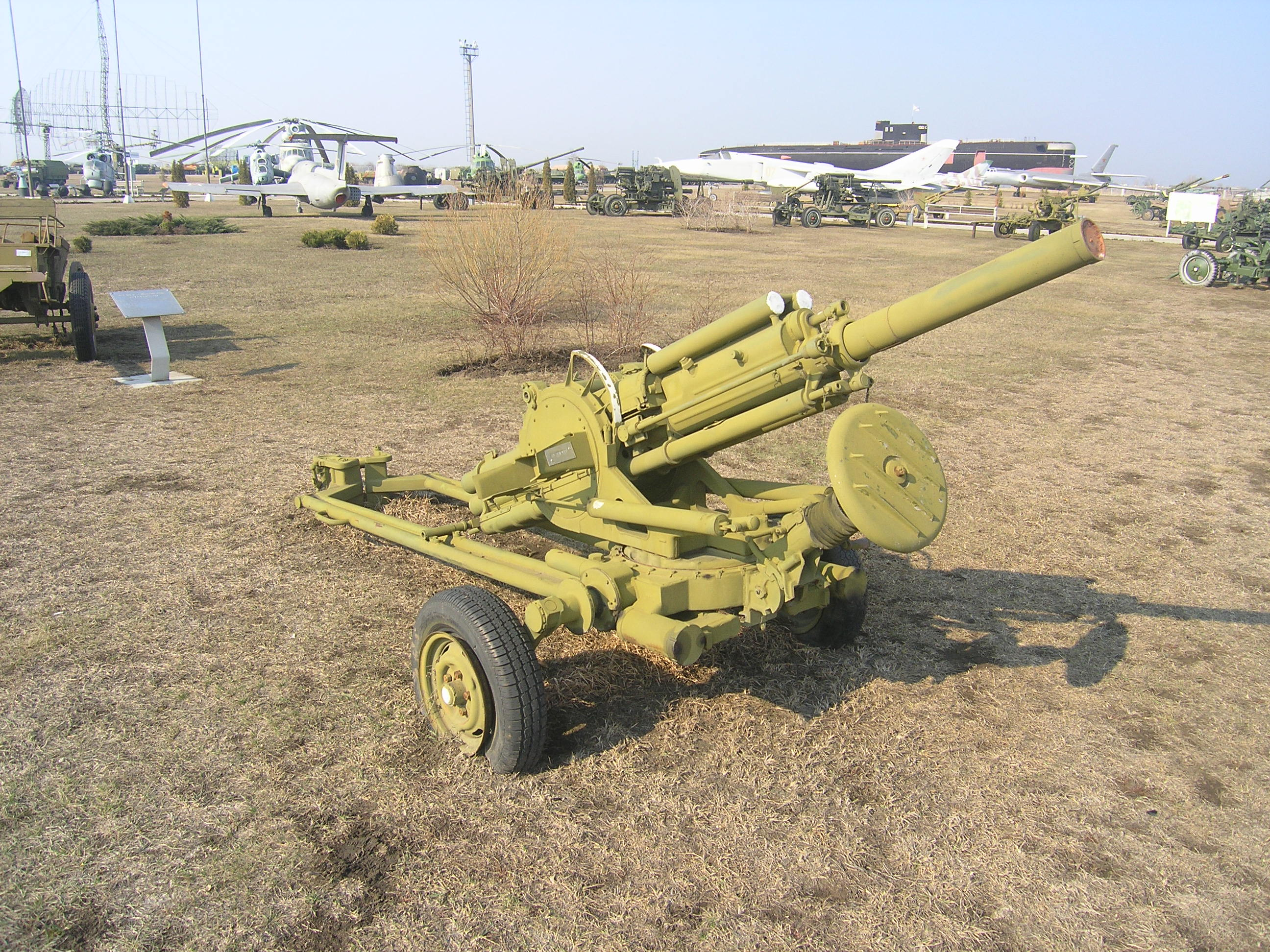
- 82 mm 2B9 Vasilek Gun-mortar
- Type: Automatic gun-mortar
- Place of origin: Soviet Union

Service history
- In service: 1970–present
- Wars: Soviet–Afghan War; Syrian Civil War; Russo-Ukrainian War; Second Nagorno-Karabakh War

Production history
- Manufacturer: Bolshevik Plant, Norinco, Diósgyőri Gépgyár

Specifications
- Mass: 632 kg (1,393 lb)
- Shell: 3.23 kg (7 lb 2 oz) bomb
- Caliber: 82 mm (3.2 in)
- Breech: muzzle loaded or breech loaded
- Elevation: −1° to 85°
- Traverse: 60°
- Rate of fire: 100–120 rpm
- Muzzle velocity: 270 m/s (890 ft/s)
- Maximum firing range: 4,270 m (14,010 ft)
- Sights: PAM-1 2.5× or 3×

The 2B9 Vasilek (2Б9 "Василёк" - Cornflower) also known as Vasilyek, AM 289 Vasilyek or AM 2B9 Vasilyek, is an automatic 82 mm gun-mortar developed in the Soviet Union in 1967 and fielded with the Soviet Army in 1970.

== Description ==
It was based on the F-82 automatic mortar. The 2B9 is a semiautomatic breechloader that makes use of four-round clips or is loaded with individual rounds. Rounds can be loaded from either the muzzle or the breech. Because of its wheeled carriage, the 2B9 resembles a light artillery piece more than a conventional mortar.

The 2B9 was used in Afghanistan by Soviet units and is still found in Russian airmobile infantry units. In the fighting in Afghanistan, Soviet units found the 2B9 to be a versatile and useful weapon. The 2B9 can fire high-explosive, armor-piercing, smoke, and illumination rounds. The armor-piercing projectile, which weighs 3.1 kg (6.8 lb), has a 75 g (2.6 oz) warhead that can penetrate 100 mm (3.9 in) of armor. The high-explosive shell produces 400 to 600 fragments.

The 2B9 can be towed but is usually carried on a modified GAZ-66 military truck. By 1988, the 2B9 was also deployed as a self-propelled weapon by mounting the gun-mortar in the rear of an MT-LB armored personnel carrier.

During the Syrian Civil War, the 2B9M Vasilek was used by the Syrian Armed Forces, Kurdish People's Protection Units, and the Islamist group Ansar al-Sham. The latter used a 2B9M automatic mortar near Mount Chalma, Kesab district.

During the Russo-Ukrainian War a MT-LB chassis was spotted fitted with 2B9 mortar and a UB-32 rocket pod.

== Variants ==
=== Towed ===
- 2B9 Vasilek − Basic model
  - 2B9M Vasilek – Modernised version introduced in 1982, and adopted in 1983.
- DE-82 − Upgraded Hungarian version developed in 1987.
- Type W99 − 2B9 Vasilek produced in the People's Republic of China by Norinco. A 81 mm version was also made for the export market

=== Self-propelled ===
- Vasilyek on MT-LB − During the Soviet–Afghan War, the Soviets often removed the wheels of the 2B9 before mounting the gun on the chassis of a MT-LB tracked vehicle. These improvised designs remain in service with the Russian Ground Forces
- Vasilyek on ACRV − Hungarian modification, it was a Vasilyek mounted on the modified chassis of a MT-LBu, trials were conducted but ultimately it did not enter production
- Vasilyek on BMP-1 − Hungarian prototype using the modified chassis of a BMP-1 infantry fighting vehicle. It did not enter production
- Norinco 81 mm mobile mortar system − In 2008, Norinco completed the development of a 81 mm Type W99 mounted on a vehicle chassis for the export market
- Scorpion − In 2004, the US Army with the assistance of Picatinny Arsenal engineers, fitted a Hungarian-supplied 2B9 Vasilek into the rear of a Humvee chassis as a proof of concept for the Army and Marine Corps. It can carry 191 rounds and the armoured cab provides ballistic and blast overpressure protection for the crew. Ultimately, it wasn't adopted by the Army.

== Operators ==
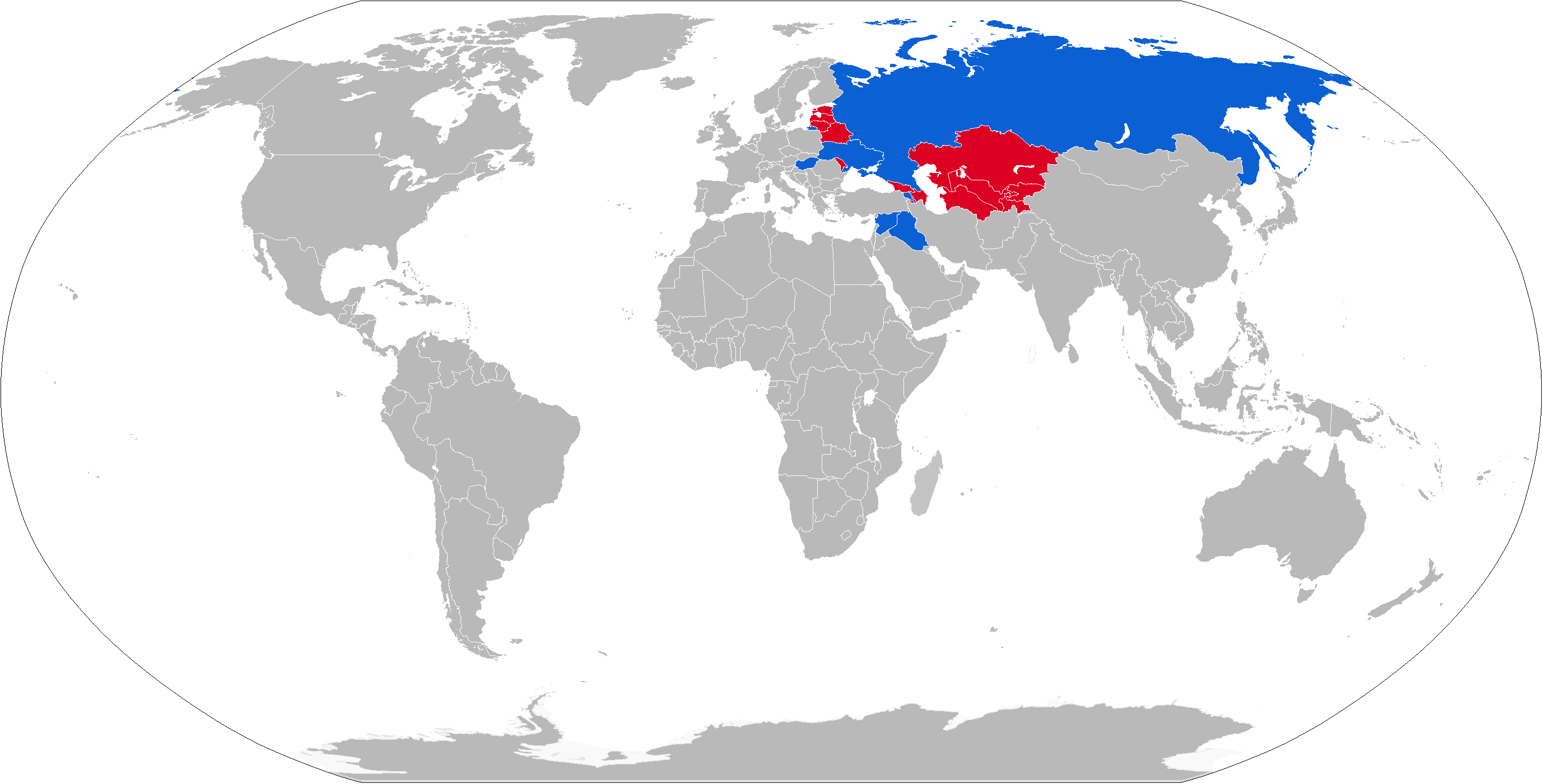
Map with 2B9 operators in blue with former operators in red

=== Current ===
- Armenia
- Azerbaijan
- Belarus
- Hungary
- Kazakhstan
- Kyrgyzstan
- Moldova
- Russia
- Syria – Used by both government and rebel forces in the Syrian Civil War
- Turkmenistan
- Ukraine – Used by both government and Donetsk People's Republic, Luhansk People's Republic forces in the war in Donbas
- Uzbekistan

=== Former ===
- Bosnia and Herzegovina − Also used by Army of Republika Srpska
- Croatia − Also used by the HVO
- Montenegro
- (Afghanistan) Northern Alliance − Reported
- Poland
- Serbia
- Soviet Union – Passed down to successor states.

=== Evaluation-only ===
- United States − A HMMWV fitted with a 2B9 Vasilek entered trials in 2004 for the US Army and Marine Corps, but it wasn't accepted for service

== See also ==
- Automatic grenade launcher
