= 100 mm field gun M1944 (BS-3) =

100 mm field gun model 1944 (BS-3)
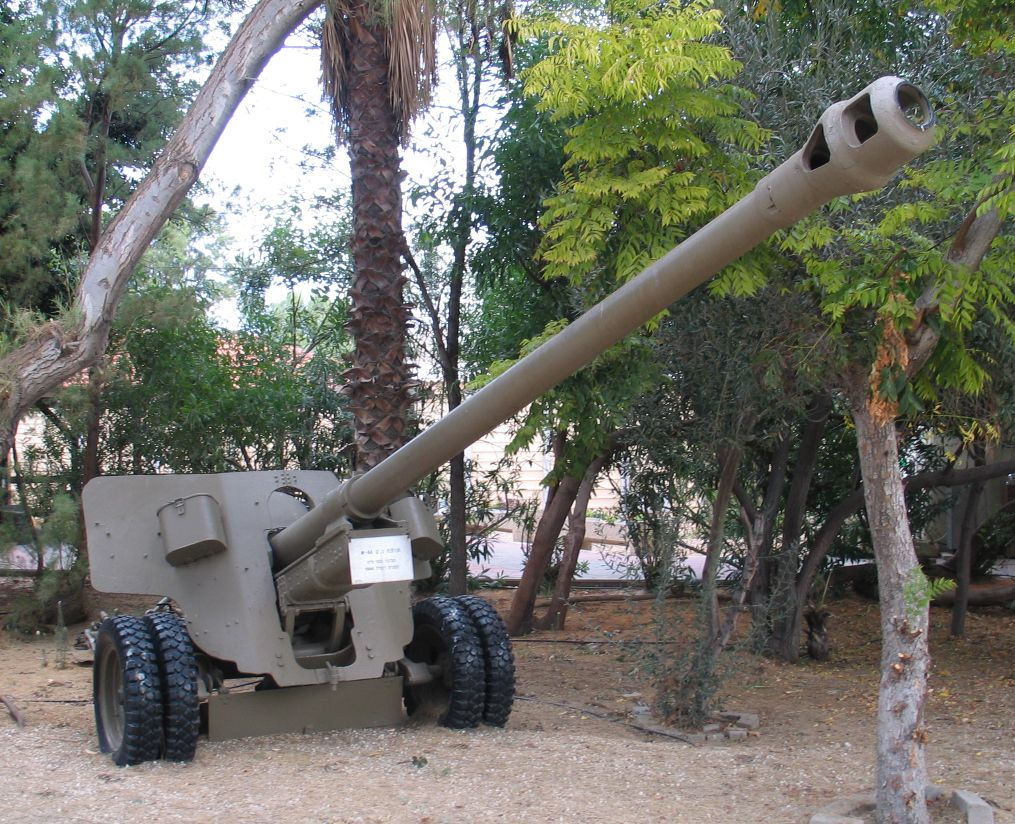
- BS-3 at the Israel Defense Forces History Museum, Israel
- Type: Field gun and anti-tank gun
- Place of origin: Soviet Union

Service history
- In service: 1944–present
- Used by: Soviet Union
- Wars: World War II; Vietnam War; Six-Day War; India–Pakistan war of 1971; Yom Kippur War; Lebanese Civil War; Russo-Ukrainian War

Production history
- Produced: 1944–1951

Specifications
- Mass: 3,650 kg (8,047 lbs)
- Length: 9.37 m (30 ft 9 in)
- Barrel length: Bore: 5.34 m (17 ft 6 in) L/53.5; Overall: 5.96 m (19 ft 7 in) L/59.6 (with muzzle brake)
- Width: 2.15 m (7 ft 1 in)
- Height: 1.5 m (4 ft 11 in)
- Crew: 6 to 8
- Shell: 100 × 695 mmR (R/147mm)
- Caliber: 100 mm (3.93 in)
- Breech: Semi-automatic vertical sliding-wedge
- Recoil: hydro-pneumatic
- Carriage: Split trail
- Elevation: -5° to 45°
- Traverse: 58°
- Rate of fire: 8 to 10 rpm
- Muzzle velocity: 900 m/s (2,953 ft/s)
- Maximum firing range: 20 km (12.42 mi)

The 100 mm field gun M1944 (BS-3) (Russian: 100-мм полевая пушка обр. 1944 г. (БС-3)) is a Soviet 100 mm (3.9 in) anti-tank and field gun.

== History ==
=== Development ===
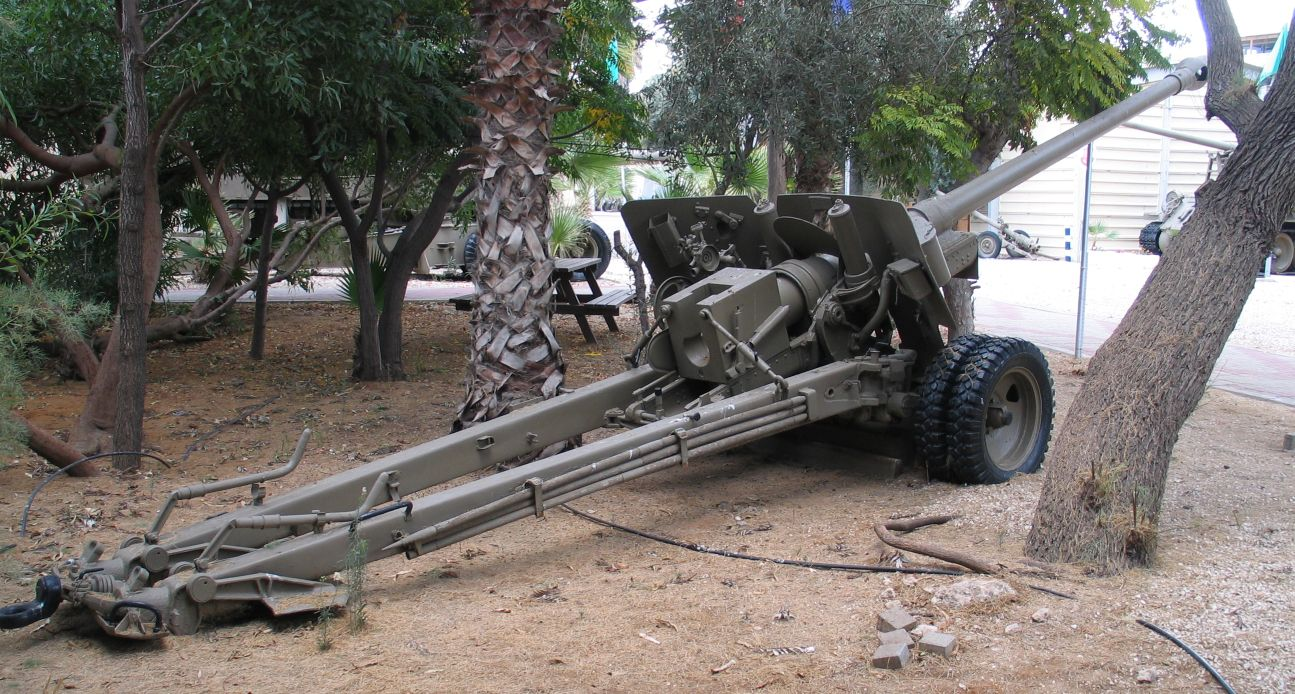
BS-3 at the Israel Defense Forces History Museum

The BS-3 was based on the B-34 naval gun. The development team was led by V. G. Grabin.

=== World War II ===
During World War II the Soviet Army employed the gun in the light artillery brigades of tank armies (20 pieces along with 48 ZiS-3) and by corps artillery. In the Second World War the BS-3 was successfully used as a powerful anti-tank gun. It was capable of defeating any contemporary tank at long range, excluding the Tiger II: to destroy that heavy tank the gun needed to shoot at less than 1,600 m (5,200 ft) from the target. The gun was capable of defeating the turret of Tiger II at a range of 800–1,000 m (2,600–3,300 ft). The gun was also used as a field gun. Though in this role it was less powerful than the 122 mm A-19, as it fired a smaller round, the BS-3 was more mobile and had a higher rate of fire.

=== Post World War II ===
The BS-3 remained in service into the 1950s. As of 1955 it was getting replaced in Soviet service by the T-12 antitank gun and the 85 mm antitank gun D-48. A number of BS-3 pieces are still stored in Russian Ground Forces arsenals. In 2012, at least 12 BS-3 guns were still active with the 18th Machine Gun Artillery Division, located on the Kuril Islands, used as anti-ship and anti-landing guns.

The gun also saw action during the Vietnam War, the Six-Day War, and the Yom Kippur War. The BS-3s also saw extensive use with the Indian Army alongside 25-pounders in the India–Pakistan war of 1971.

During the Russo-Ukrainian War (2014–present) both sides employed towed anti-tank guns. The use of the 100 mm Rapira is well known, but the Ukrainian Army also used the older BS-3. Three Ukrainian BS-3s were destroyed by Russian military forces during the initial phase of their 2022 invasion of Ukraine. In September 2023, Ukraine's State Border Guard Service released footage of a Ukrainian BS-3 crew firing on Russian positions.

== Ammunition data ==
The BS-3 ammunition can also be fired by the KS-19 anti-aircraft gun, T-54/T-55 tanks, and the SU-100 assault gun.

- Ammunition
  - AP: BR-412
  - APBC: BR-412B
  - APCBC: BR-412D
  - HE/Fragmentation
- Projectile weight
  - AP/APBC: 15.88 kg (34.97 lbs)
  - HE/Fragmentation: 15.6 kg (34.39 lbs)
- Armor penetration (BR-412B, 30° degrees)
  - 500 m : 190 mm
    (547 yds : 7.48 in)
  - 1000 m : 170 mm
    (1,093 yds : 6.69 in)

== Operators ==
=== Current ===
- Congo − 10 as of 2025
- Cyprus − 6 as of 2025
- Kyrgyzstan: 18 as of 2025
- Mongolia − Unknown as of 2025
- Mozambique − 20 as of 2025
- Nicaragua − 24 as of 2025
- Sudan − Unknown as of 2025
- Ukraine − Reactivated during the 2022 Russian invasion of Ukraine.
- Vietnam − Unknown as of 2025

=== Former ===
- Afghanistan − 250
- Bulgaria
- DR Congo
- East Germany − 144
- Egypt − 100
- Ethiopia
- India
- North Korea − 500
- Mali − 6
- Poland
- Romania
- Somalia − 35
- Soviet Union
- Syria − Some were mounted on a modified T-34 chassis
- Timor-Leste
- Yemen − 20

== See also ==
- 100 mm vz. 53 - A similar Czech anti-tank gun using the same ammunition.
- D-10 tank gun
- 8.8 cm Pak 43- A contemporary German tank gun with similar performance
