= MT-LB =

Soviet combat vehicle

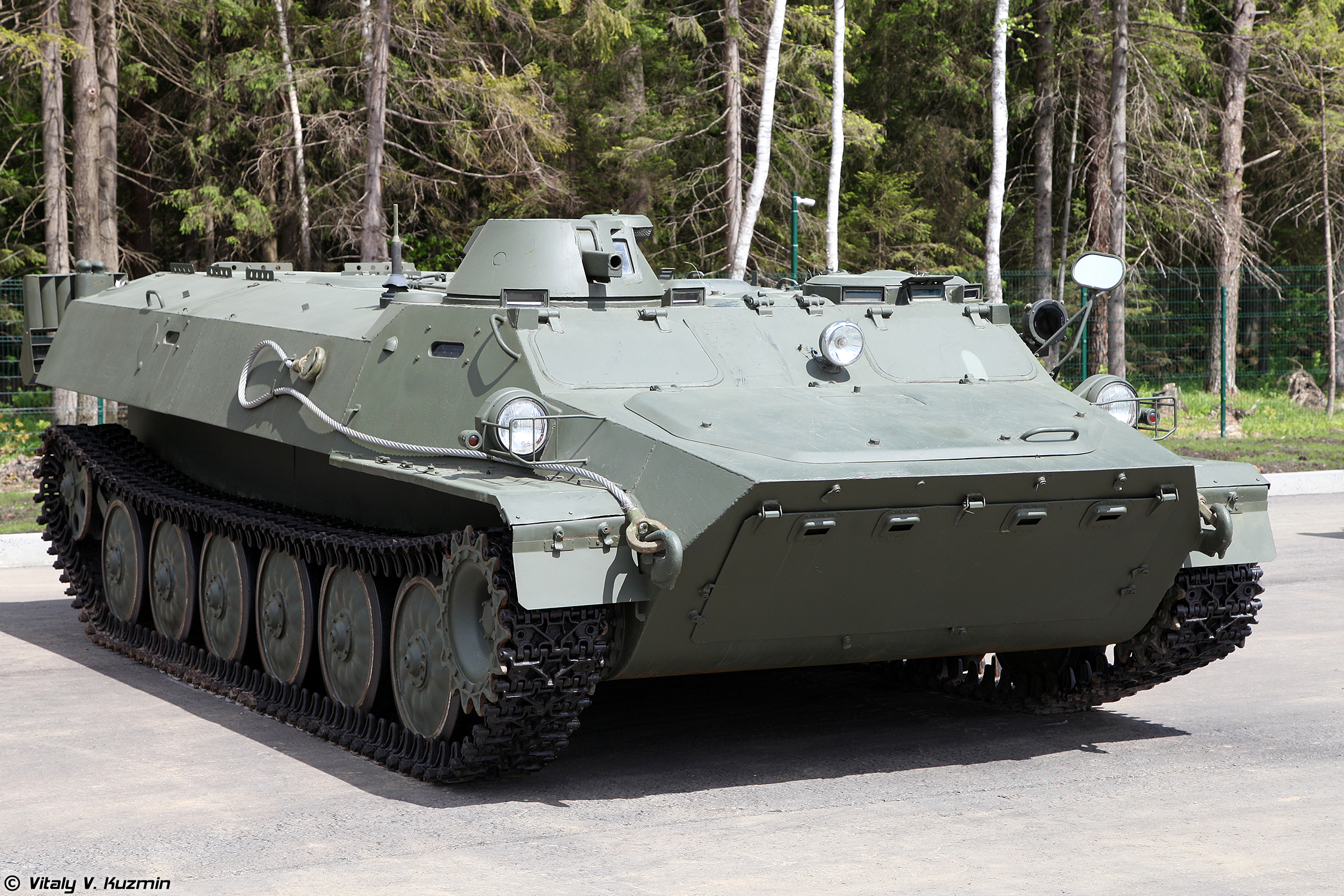
- MT-LB
- Type: Amphibious armoured personnel carrier Multi-purpose armored vehicle
- Place of origin: Soviet Union

Service history
- In service: early 1970s – present
- Used by: See Operators
- Wars: Soviet–Afghan War; Iran–Iraq War; Gulf War; Transnistrian War; First Nagorno-Karabakh War; War in Abkhazia (1992–1993); First Chechen War; Second Chechen War; Iraq War; Russo-Georgian War; Boko Haram insurgency Syrian civil war War in Iraq (2013–2017); Second Nagorno-Karabakh War; Russo-Ukrainian War

Production history
- Designer: Central Auto and Tractor Directorate
- Designed: 1950s
- Manufacturer: Kharkov Tractor Plant
- No. built: Over 55,000, including the MT-LBu

Specifications
- Mass: 11.9 tonnes (13.1 short tons; 11.7 long tons)
- Length: 6.45 m (21 ft 2 in)
- Width: 2.86 m (9 ft 5 in)
- Height: 1.86 m (6 ft 1 in)
- Crew: 2 (+ 11 passengers)
- Armor: 14 mm max.
- Main armament: 12.7mm NSV/Kord heavy machine gun; or 30mm AGS17D/AGS-30 Automatic grenade launcher, or 30mm 2A42/2A72 autocannon
- Secondary armament: PKT (2,500 rounds)
- Engine: YaMZ 238, V-8 diesel; SW 680, I6 diesel (in Poland); YaMZ 238: 240 hp at 2,100 rpm; SW 680: 240 hp at 2,200 rpm
- Power/weight: 20 hp/tonne
- Suspension: Torsion bar
- Operational range: 500 km (310 mi) (road)
- Maximum speed: 61 km/h (38 mph) (road); 30 km/h (19 mph) (off-road); 5 to 6 km/h (3.7 MPH) (in the water)

The MT-LB (Russian: Многоцелевой Тягач Легкий Бронированный (МТ-ЛБ), romanized: Mnogotselevoy tyagach legky bronirovanny, lit. 'multi-purpose towing vehicle light armoured') is a Soviet multi-purpose, fully amphibious, tracked armoured fighting vehicle in use since the 1970s. It was also produced in Poland, where (starting in the mid-1990s) its YaMZ engine was replaced by a Polish 6-cylinder SW 680 diesel engine (a locally produced copy of British Leyland O.680 engine).

== Development ==
In the 1950s, the Soviet Central Auto and Tractor Directorate began a development program to replace the AT-P series of artillery tractors (which were based on the ASU-57 airborne self-propelled gun) with a new generation of vehicles. The MT-L was developed to meet this requirement based on the PT-76 amphibious light tank chassis. The MT-LB is the armoured variant of the MT-L. Entering production in the early 1970s, it was cheap to build, being based on many existing components, e.g. the engine, which was originally developed for trucks.

It was built at the Kharkiv Tractor Plant (KhTZ) in Soviet Ukraine, and in Bulgaria. Formerly, it was also manufactured under license in Poland by Huta Stalowa Wola

== Description ==
The crew (a driver and a commander/gunner) sit in a compartment at the front of the vehicle, with the engine behind them. A compartment at the rear enables up to 11 infantry to be carried or a cargo of up to 2,000 kilograms (4,400 lb). A load of 6,500 kilograms (14,300 lb) can be towed. The vehicle is fully amphibious, being propelled by its tracks in the water.

A small turret at the front of the vehicle fits a 7.62 mm PKT machine gun with 360-degree manual traverse and an elevation of −5 to +30 degrees. The vehicle is lightly armored against small arms and shell splinters with a thickness of three to ten millimetres (0.12 to 0.39 in) of steel with a maximum of 14 millimetres (0.55 in) for the turret front.

Several weapon systems are based on this hull (for example Strela-10 or SNAR-10).

== Variants ==
=== Former USSR ===
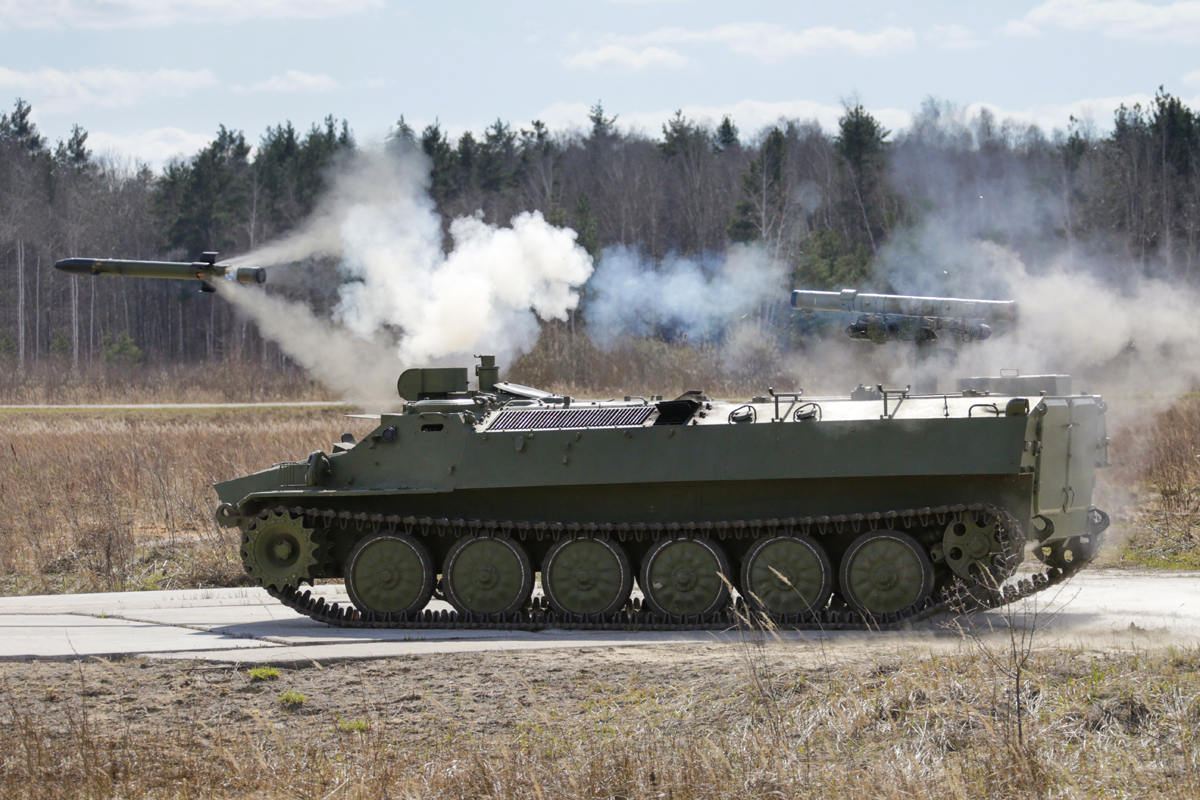
9P149 vehicle based on the MT-LB of the Shturm-S tank destroyer.

- MT-L
  - MT-LB (izdeliye 6) – basic model, often used as simple APC but also as artillery tractor or ambulance. In the West, the term MT-LB Blade or MT-LB M1980 is used for vehicles that are fitted with a hydraulic dozer blade.

=== Bulgaria ===
- Bulgaria has various models of the MT-LB in service, as of 2016. Along with the base model, between 1971 and 2012, Bulgaria manufactured the MT-LB VM variation with improved snow and swamp-going capabilities.

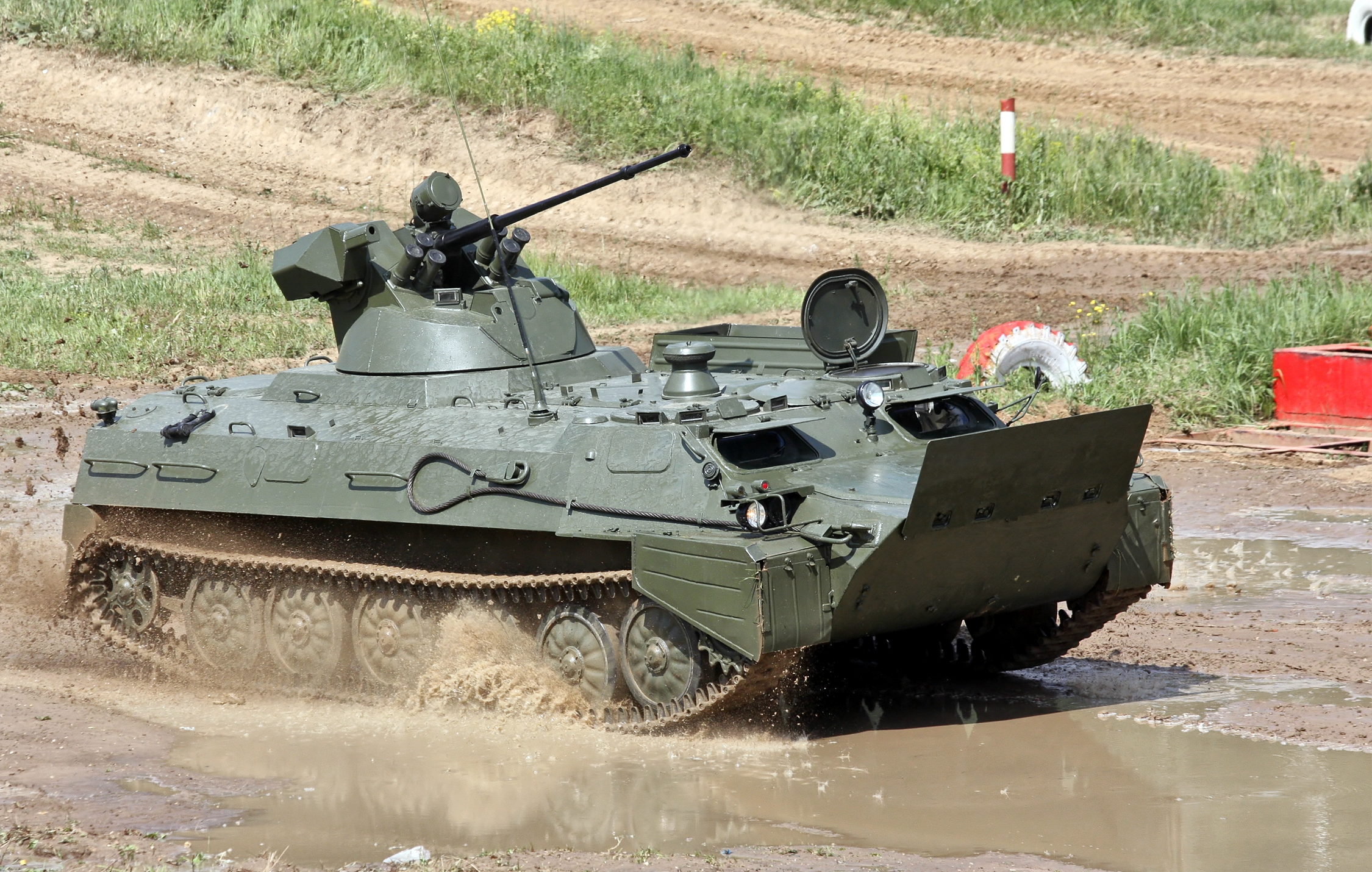
The upgraded MT-LBM 6MB with MB2 turret, whose main armament is a 2A72 30 mm automatic cannon.

=== East Germany ===
- MT-LB (Pi) – combat engineer vehicle.
- MT-LB (Pzj) – version for anti-tank units.
- MT-LB (Pzj Fü) – command vehicle for anti-tank units.
- MT-LB (BO) SFL – battery command vehicle in self-propelled artillery units.
- San MT-LB – ambulance
- MTP-LB – technical support vehicle.

=== Iraq ===
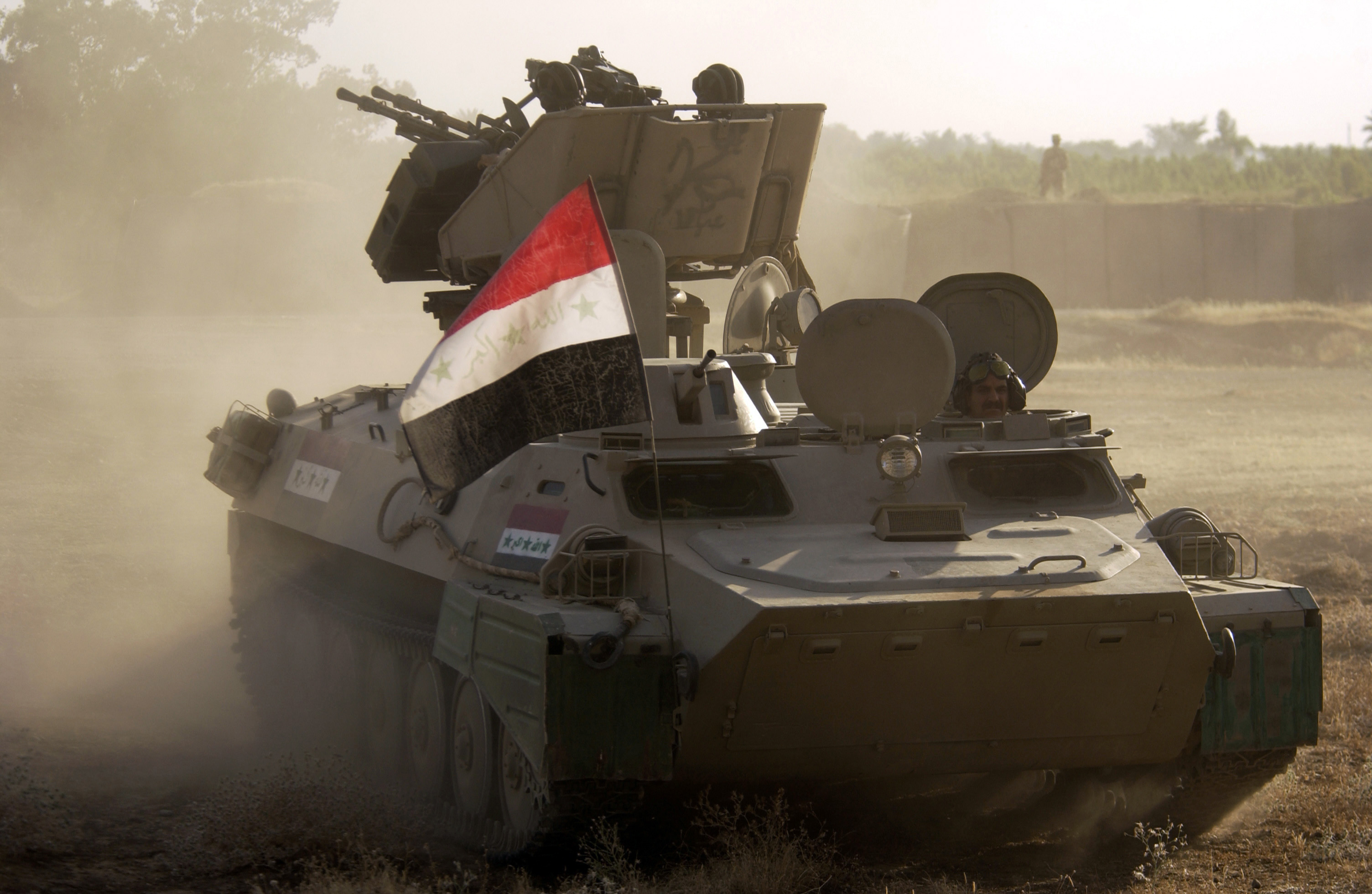
Iraqi MT-LB converted into a SPAAG armed with a ZU-2 anti-aircraft gun.

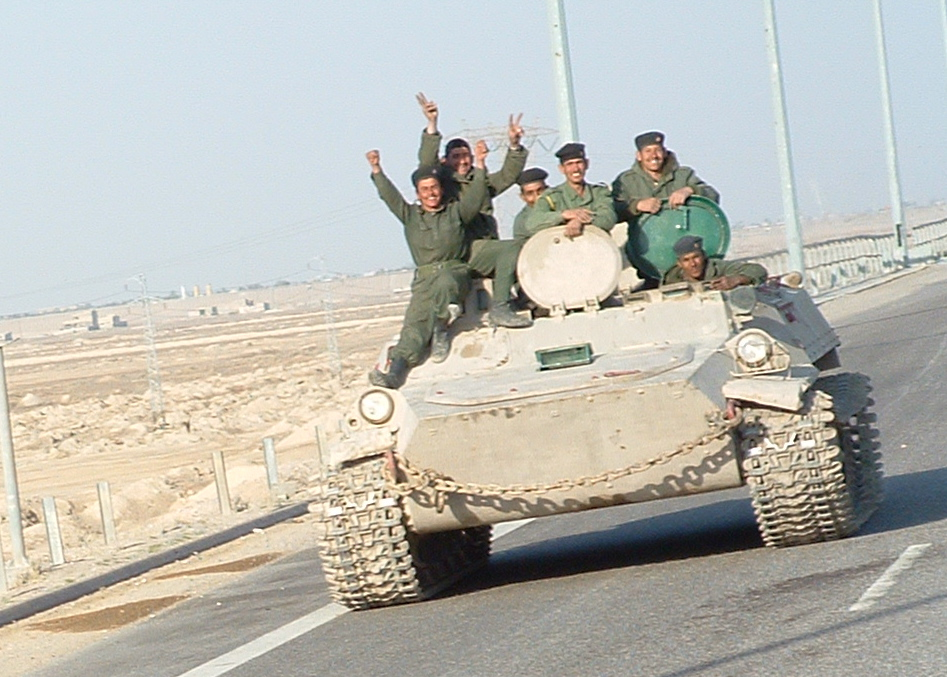
Iraqi MT-LBV fitted with wider tracks.

- MT-LB converted into a SPAAG by mounting a ZU-23-2 23×152mm twin anti-aircraft gun on the rear part of the vehicle. The gun had its wheels removed and as such cannot be easily dismounted and used separately. There were at least two variations of this conversion; one with the ZU-23-2 mounted in an open-topped turret, the other with the ZU-23-2 mounted on a platform extending beyond the hull of the MT-LB with a roof for the gun operators. The second version was most likely intended to be used in a fire support role, as the roof would hinder the gun's sights at high elevation.

=== Poland ===
Polish HSW S.A. (Huta Stalowa Wola S.A.) license produced MT-LB since 1976, and it also developed a modified chassis SPG-2, with better floating capabilities.

- MT-LB-2AP – APC variant with a turret from SKOT-2AP, armed with high elevation 14.5mm KPVT MG and 7.62mm PKT CMG. Prototype only.
- WEM Lotos – medical evacuation vehicle with four stretchers.
- WPT Mors – armoured recovery and repair vehicle, produced from 1983.
- R-137T (radiostacja ruchoma UKF) – signals vehicle with VHF radio set R-137. Entered service in 1987 and has a range of 70 to 150 km.
  - ZWD-1 "Irys" (zautomatyzowany wóz dowodzenia) – command vehicle, belongs to the automated command set "Irys".
- MT-LB-23M "Krak" – APC variant with a 23 mm gun in an unmanned turret. Prototype only.
- Promet – self-propelled AA gun with twin 23 mm guns, from 1979. Four prototypes only.
- "Przebiśnieg" – electronic warfare system, consists of three different vehicles:
  - SZ or MT-LB Z (stacja zakłóceń) – EW/Jamming vehicle;
  - SR or MT-LB R (stacja rozpoznania) – Comint/Sigint vehicle;
  - WD krel – command post vehicle (wóz dowodzenia kompanii radioelektronicznej).
- SPG-2 – much-modified base vehicle, with reworked nose section and hydro jets for better floating:
  - TRI Hors – engineering reconnaissance vehicle, built in series from 1983, armed with 12.7mm NSVT AAMG mounted on a turret;
  - WPT Mors-II – armoured recovery and repair vehicle, produced from 1986, armed with 12.7mm NSVT AAMG mounted on a turret;
  - Opal-I and Opal-II – artillery command vehicles, with a turret with NSWT-12.7 Utios: Opal-I with a 245 hp (180 kW) turbocharged diesel engine SW680/167/1, Opal-II with a 300 hp (220 kW) engine SW680T (YaMZ-238N) and a longer chassis with 7 road wheels on each side. Prototypes only
  - BWO-40 – infantry fighting vehicle with 40 mm Bofors gun. A similar turret was mounted on the BWP-40 (BMP-1 upgrade). Prototype only.

=== Russia ===
==== Vehicle in service ====
- MT-LB
- MT-LBV - entering service in 1972, introduced new roadwheel swing arms, fenders and mudguards to accommodate a wider set of tracks. A modification with wider tracks (670mm instead of 350mm) for lower ground pressure for snow/swamp operations.
- MT-LBVM - equipped with the NSVT 12.7mm anti-aircraft machine gun mount instead of the TKB-01-1 turret.
- MT-LBVMK – a modification of MT-LBVM with a 12.7mm Kord instead of a 12.7mm NSVT machine gun. Engine: YaMZ-238VM with rated power of 240 hp.
- MT-LBVM1K - mountain modification, equipped with the new YaMZ-238BL-1 engine with rated power of 300 hp, new on-board radio station and new heater.
- MT-LBu – a bigger, unarmed version that is used as the basis for many specialised vehicles. It has a more powerful engine, a 40 cm higher hull and a longer chassis with 7 road wheels on each side, instead of 6.
- MT-LBM 6MB - 30mm autocannon turret mounted above the main compartment.

==== Prototypes ====
- MT-LB 6MB3 - Modification from Muromteplovoz with AG-17 grenade launcher, 12.7mm Kord and a GSh-23-2. Possibly only one made.
- MT-LB 6MA - Modification using BPU-1 turret mounted above main compartment.

Hybrid/field-modified vehicles:

- MT-LB with ZU-23 AA gun
- MT-LB With a 14.5mm BPU-1 Turret
- MT-LB with a 14.5mm 2M-7 naval gun mount
- MT-LB with an AZP S-60 AA gun
- MT-LB with a 100mm MT-12 anti-tank gun
- MT-LB with an 82 mm automatic mortar 2B9 Vasilek together with UB-32 rocket pod
- MT-LB with a 25 mm 2M-3 naval gun
- MT-LB with an 140mm Ogon-22 MLRS likely salvaged from a Zubr-class LCAC, the only known vehicle to use this system. Please note that in Russian, the Ogon-22 MLRS is described as a flamethrower, however the term "rocket-assisted thermobaric weapon" would be more accurate.
- MT-LB with an RBU-6000 213 mm caliber Soviet anti-submarine rocket launcher.

==== Vehicle not in service ====
- Toros – Arctic adapted vehicle developed by Muromteplovoz, armed with a 30mm autocannon 2A42, PKMT 7.62mm machine gun, and 30mm AGS-17D grenade launcher, and equipped with a snowplow.

=== Sweden ===
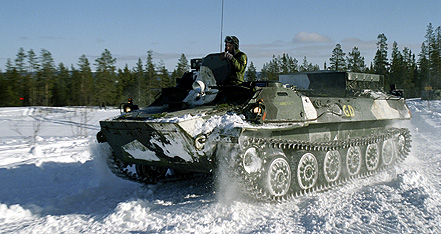
Swedish MT-LB converted into Pbv 401

- Pbv 401 (pansarbandvagn) – a modified former East-German vehicle with 7.62 mm machine guns Ksp 95 and Ksp 58.

=== Ukraine ===
- MT-LBMSh – announced in 2017, and built for Myanmar by the Kharkiv Tractor Plant. Equipped with a KBA-105 "Shkval" combat module with a 30 mm autocannon, KT-7,62 machine gun, KBA-117 30 mm grenade launcher, six smoke grenade launchers 902B Tucha, and Barrier ATGM system. The vehicle also has reinforced armour and a new YaMZ-238B engine with 330 horsepower.

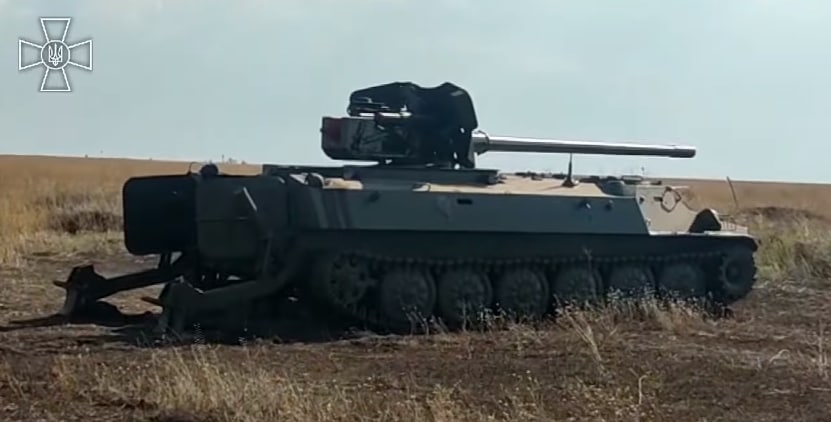
MT-LB-12

- MT-LB-12 – A 2022 modification in which an MT-12 Rapira 100 mm anti-tank gun was mounted on top of the vehicle with an open-topped superstructure for cover. Seen in use with the Kraken Regiment, the 59th Mechanized Brigade, and Territorial Defence Forces. In late September 2022, the Ukrainian gas company Ukrtransgaz presented a version with range increased by 2–3 km (1.2–1.9 mi) and improved protection. During the Russian invasion of Ukraine, Ukraine also deployed improvised chop-jobs combining the hulls of the MT-LB with the 85 mm divisional gun D-44.
- BMP-1LB − Infantry fighting vehicle equipped with slat armour, and a BM-7 Parus remote-controlled weapon station featuring a 30 mm autocannon, twin machine guns, and an automatic grenade launcher. Early models suffered from slow speed and weak engines.

== Operators ==
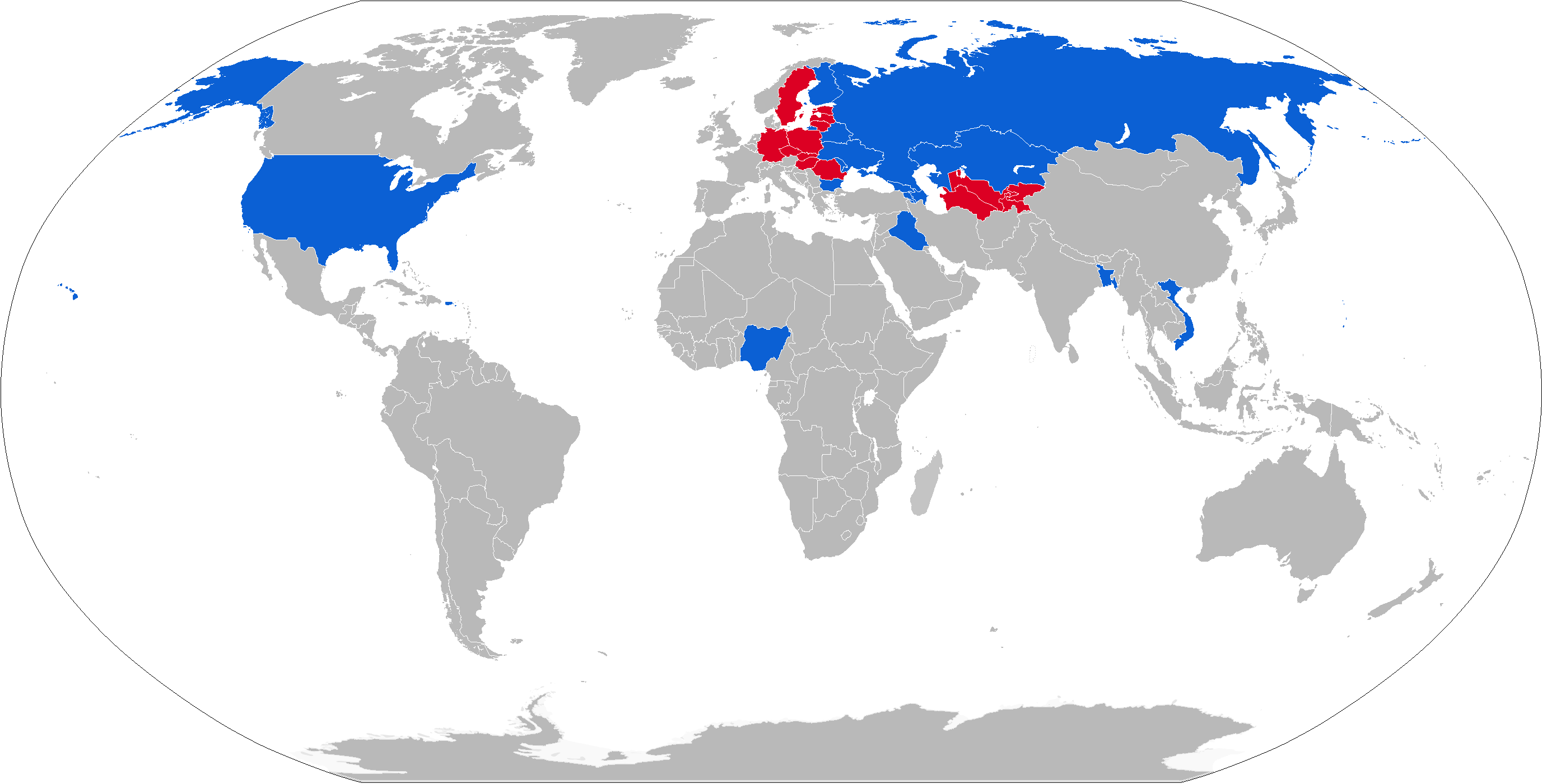
Map of MT-LB operators Current Former

=== Current operators ===
- Armenia
- Azerbaijan – 336
- Angola – 31

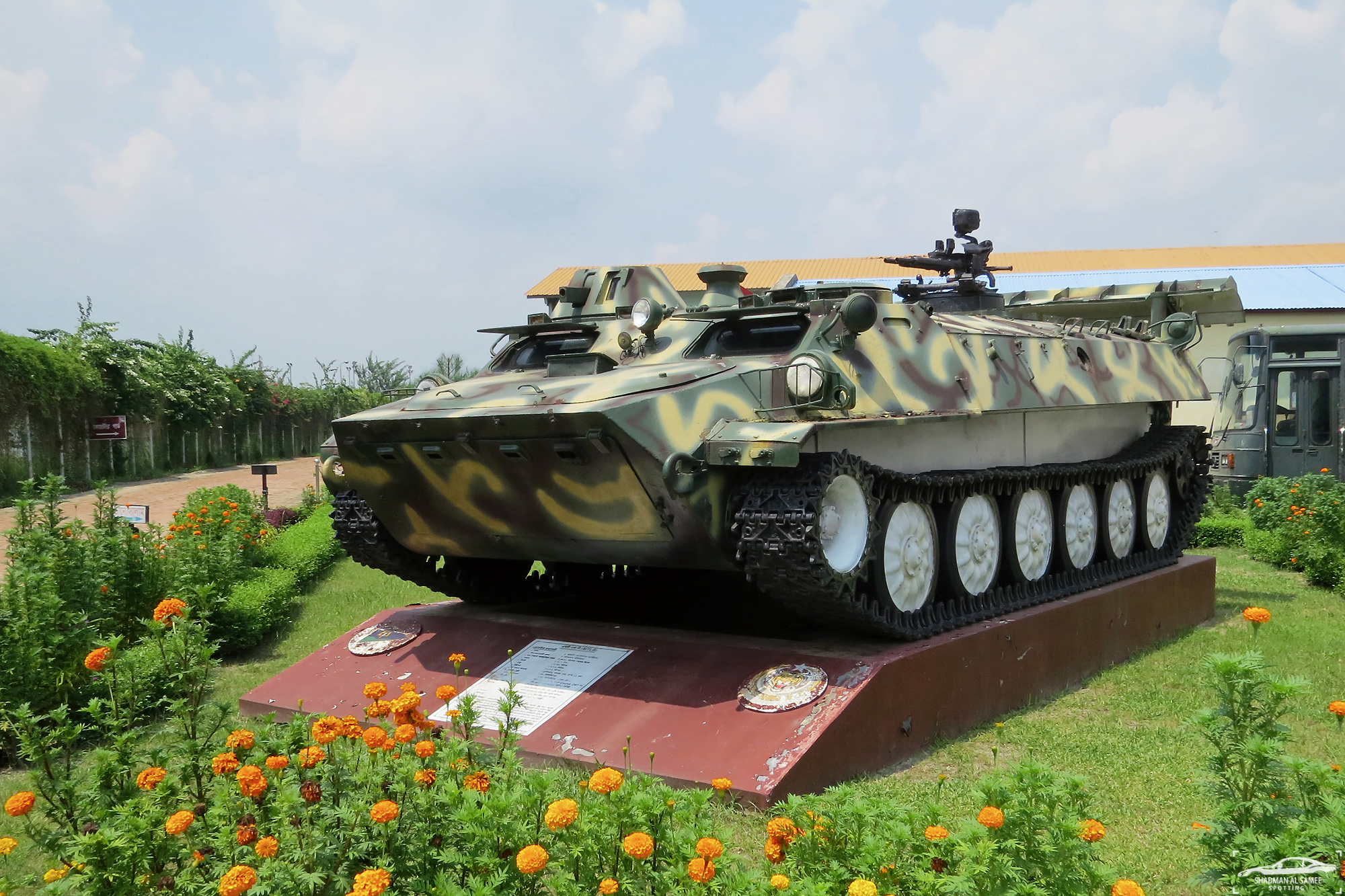
Bangladesh Army MT-LB on exhibition.

- Bangladesh – 134
- Bulgaria – 100 MT-LB in service as of 2024.
- Belarus – 70
- Congo-Kinshasa – 6
- Eritrea – 10
- Finland – 320 MT-LBu/MT-LBV in service as of 2024.
- Georgia – 66+ in Service
- Iraq – About 400 in Service.
  - Kurdistan Region
- Kazakhstan – 150
- Moldova – 60
- Myanmar – 350+ of MT-LBMSh
- Nigeria – 67
- North Korea – unknown number of HT-16PGJ based on Strela-10
- North Macedonia – 10 MT-LB in service as of 2024.
- People's Defense Units (YPG)
- Russia – 3,300 in active service before the start of Russo-Ukrainian War. As of May 9, 2025, Russia has lost 1710 MT-LBs of various variants in the Russo-Ukrainian War.
- Syria
- Transnistria
- Vietnam Strela-10, Snar-10 and bought Soviet leftover at Cam Ranh naval base.
- Ukraine – 2,090. In 2018 nine MT-LBs received from Poland (those vehicles were previously in Polish service).
  - As of May 9, 2025, Ukraine has lost 156 MT-LBs of various variants during Russia's invasion.
- Uruguay – 5
- United States – Used by opposing force units for training purposes.

=== Former operators ===
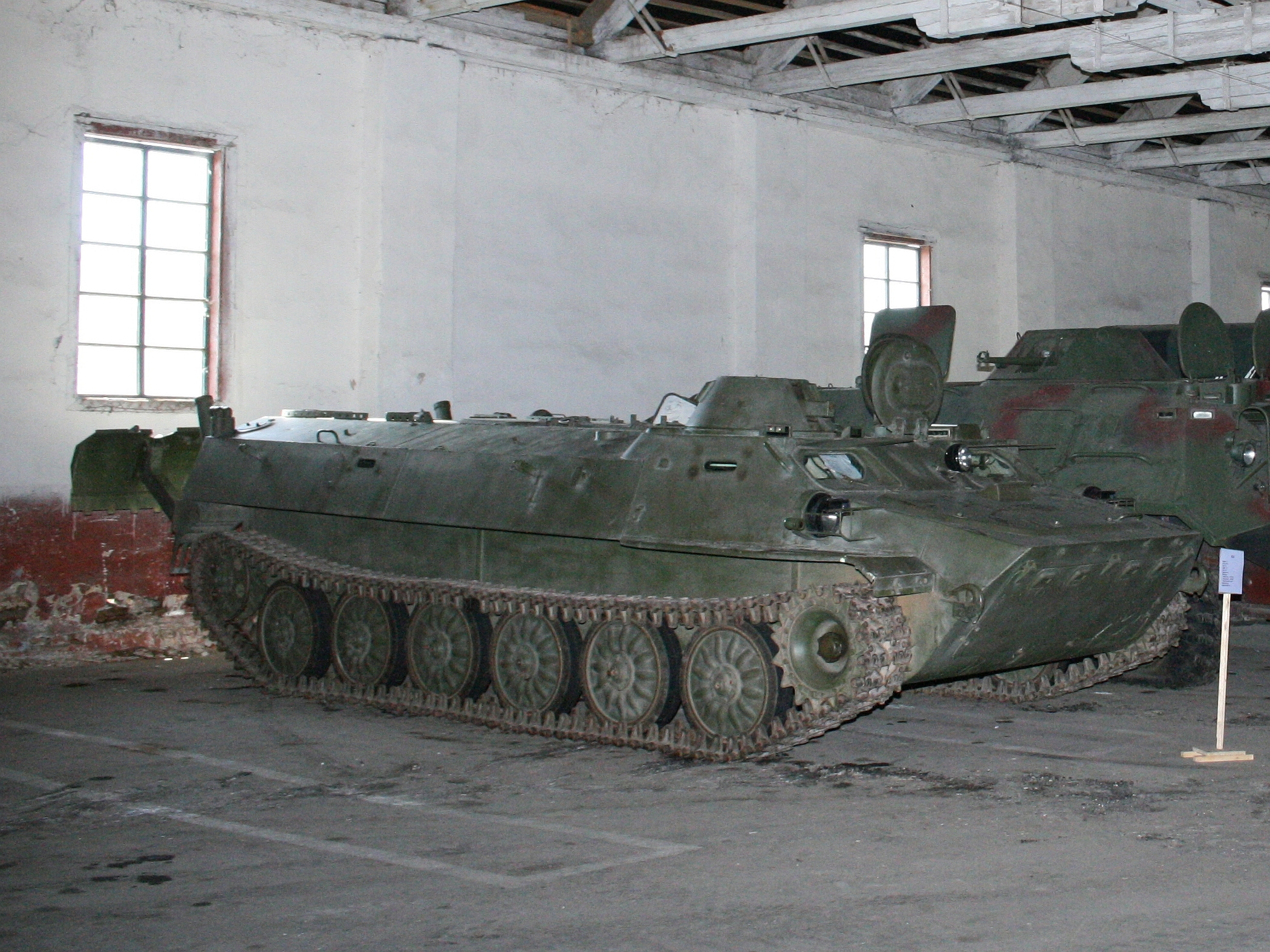
Lithuanian Army MT-LB on exhibition.

- Artsakh − Seized by Azerbaijan after the 2023 Azerbaijani offensive in Nagorno-Karabakh.
- Croatia – 6 SNAR-10 stored, for scrap.
- Czechoslovakia – Passed on to the Czech Republic.
- East Germany – 721 Bulgarian-made MT-LBs, 32 SNAR-10 and 36 Strela-10M. Unified with West Germany.
- Germany – taken from GDR's army, all scrapped or sold to other countries.
- Hungary – Strela-10 and SNAR-10
- Islamic State
- Lithuania – 10 retired.
- Poland – 15 retired
- Soviet Union – Passed on to successor states.
- Sweden – 460 (Locally designated Pbv 401, former East German, bought in 1993, then decommissioned gradually until the last 147 examples were sold to Finland in 2011)
- Yugoslavia

== See also ==
- MT-LBu – (Soviet Union)
- M113 armored personnel carrier – (United States)
- BMP-1 – (Soviet Union)
- BMP-2 – (Soviet Union)
- BMP-3 – (Soviet Union, Russia)
- BTR-50 – (Soviet Union) – a similar vehicle based on PT-76 light tank
- List of AFVs
