= 100 mm vz. 53 =

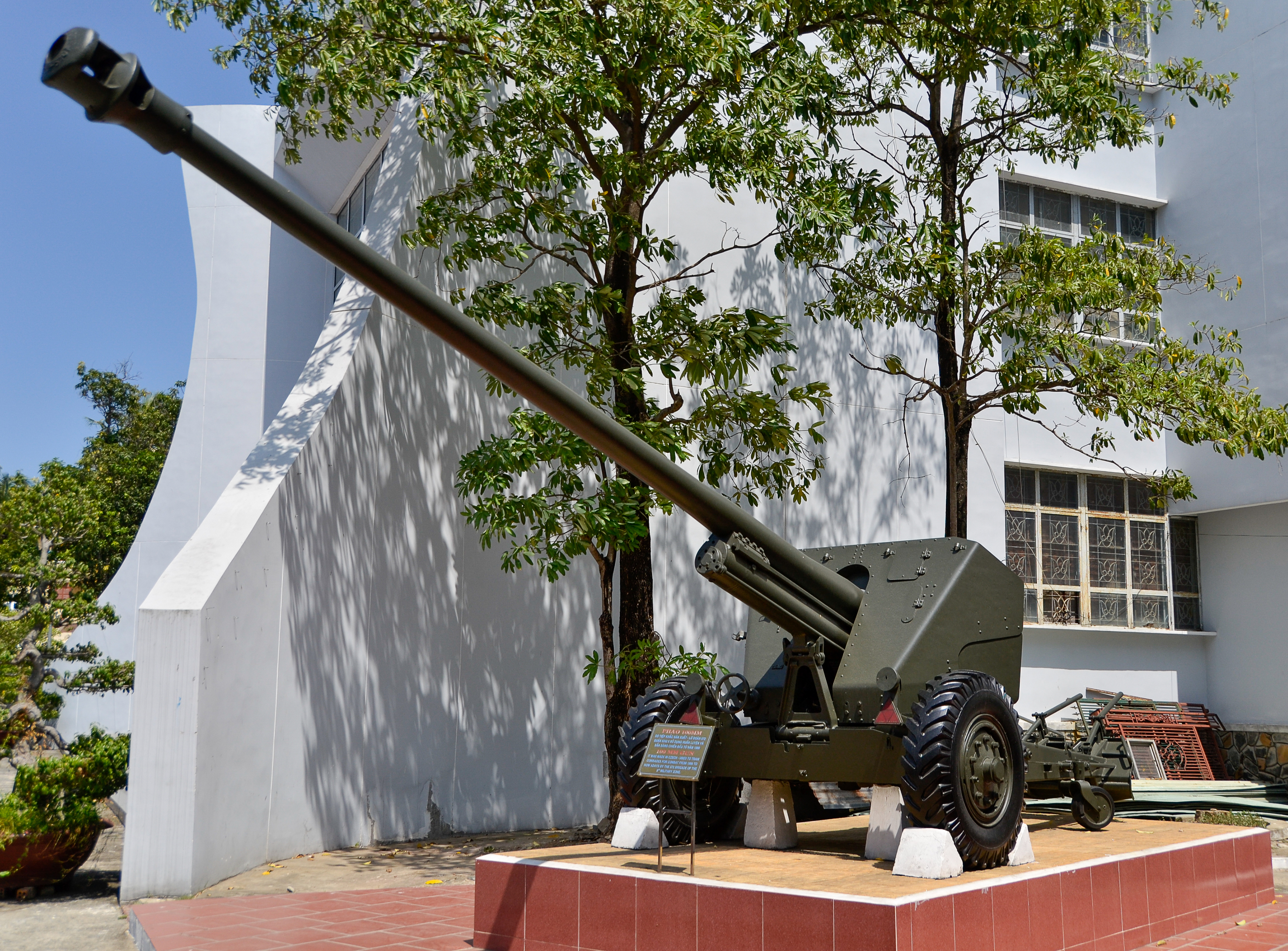
- Type: Field gun Anti-tank gun
- Place of origin: Czechoslovakia

Service history
- In service: 1956–present
- Used by: Czechoslovakia

Production history
- Designer: Škoda
- Designed: 1953
- Manufacturer: Škoda
- Produced: 1956–1960
- No. built: 600

Specifications
- Mass: 3,400 kg (7,500 lb)
- Length: 8.5 m (27 ft 11 in)
- Barrel length: 6.4 m (21 ft) L/64 (with muzzle brake)
- Width: 2.17 m (7 ft 1 in)
- Height: 2.6 m (8 ft 6 in)
- Crew: 8
- Shell: Fixed QF 100 × 695 mm R
- Caliber: 100 mm (3.9 in)
- Breech: Semi-automatic vertical sliding-wedge
- Recoil: Hydro-pneumatic
- Carriage: Split-trail
- Elevation: -6° to +42°
- Traverse: 60°
- Rate of fire: 10 rpm
- Muzzle velocity: APHE: 1,000 m/s (3,300 ft/s); HE: 900 m/s (3,000 ft/s); HEAT: 800 m/s (2,600 ft/s)
- Maximum firing range: 21 km (13 mi)

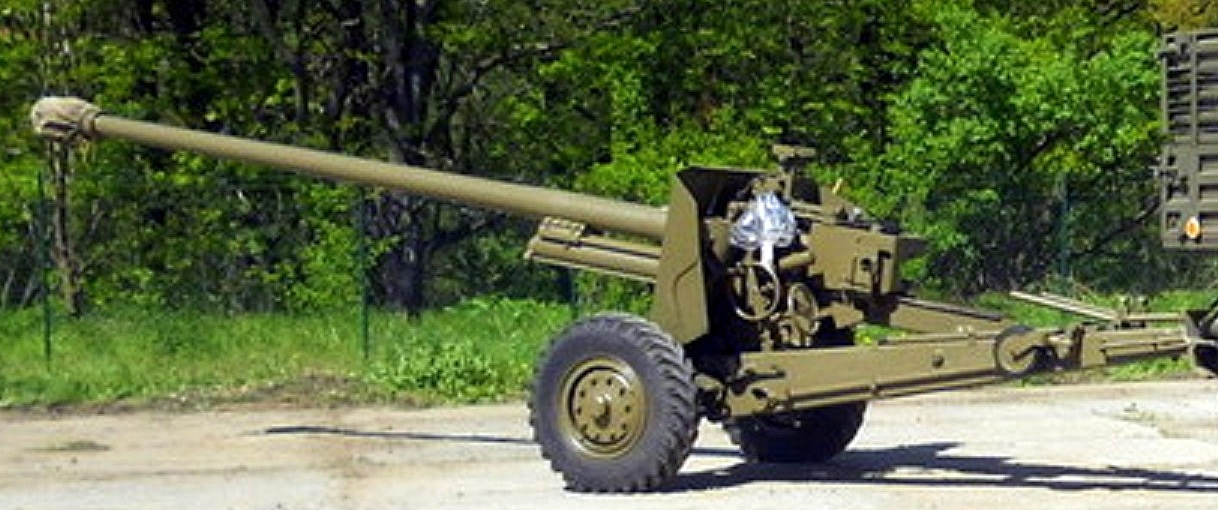

The 100 mm vz. 53 was a dual-purpose field gun and anti-tank gun designed and produced for the Czechoslovak Army during the 1950s.

== History ==
When Czechoslovakia was created with the dissolution of Austro-Hungarian Empire after World War I it inherited a large and capable arms manufacturing industry. This allowed the new state to both design and produce its weapons for domestic use and for export. After World War II this design and manufacturing experience allowed Czechoslovakia to not only produce Soviet designs under license but to produce equipment for its use and for export to its Warsaw Pact allies. A consequence of its membership in the Warsaw Pact was that the military hardware it produced used Soviet caliber ammunition. This standardization was also pursued by NATO members, but with their own calibers of ammunition.

== Design ==
Design and development of the vz. 53 began in 1948 at the Škoda Works in Plzeň under the company designation of A20. Problems with the design of ammunition led to production being discontinued in 1950. It wasn't until 1953 that the problems were resolved and development resumed with designation vz.53. The vz.53 was designed to fill the same roles as the Soviet 100 mm field gun M1944 (BS-3) and used the same ammunition. Its performance was similar to that of the M1944 but since it was a unique design it had different dimensions. For night fighting it could be fitted with an infra-red sight.

Similarities

- Fixed QF 100 x 695 mm R ammunition
- Split-trail carriage
- Semi-automatic vertical sliding-wedge breech
- Gun shield
- Hydro-pneumatic recoil system
- Double-baffle muzzle brake

Differences

- Weight
- Length
- Barrel length
- Single tires
- Elevation
- Traverse

Ammunition
Type	Model	Weight	Penetration
Armor Piercing	BR-412	15.88 kg (35 lb)	?
Armor Piercing Ballistic Capped	BR-412B, BR-412D	15.88 kg (35 lb)	?
High Explosive/Fragmentation	?	15.6 kg (34 lb)	?
High Explosive Anti-tank	?	?	380 mm (15 in)
