= 85 mm anti-tank gun D-48 =

85-mm antitank gun D-48
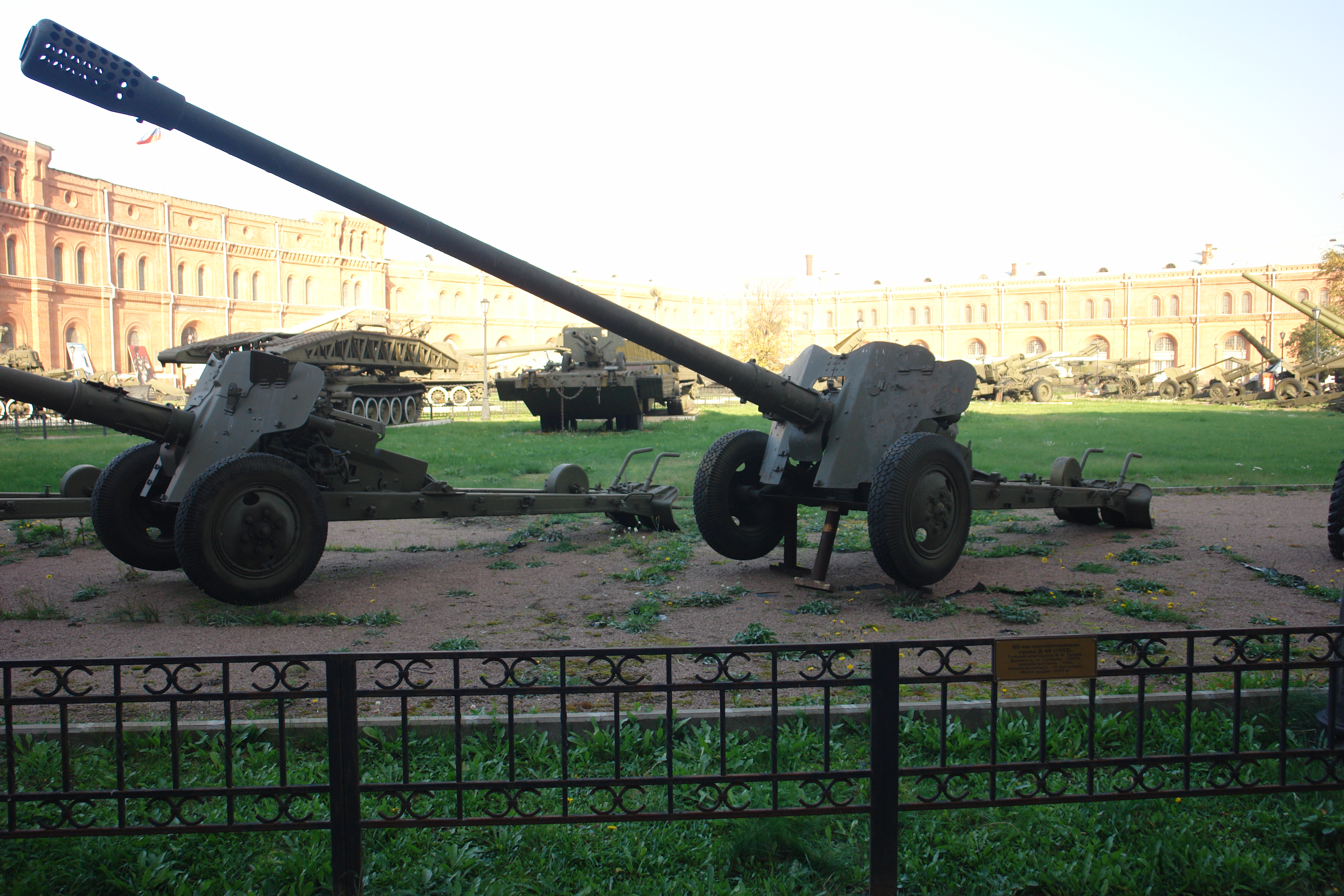
- 85 mm antitank gun D-48.
- Type: Anti-tank gun
- Place of origin: Soviet Union

Service history
- Wars: Lebanese Civil War; First Chechen War; Second Chechen War

Production history
- Designed: 1948
- Produced: 1955–1957
- Variants: Type 60

Specifications
- Mass: 2,350 kg (5,180.8 lbs)
- Length: 8.72 m (28.6 ft)
- Barrel length: 74 calibers (6.29 m)
- Width: 1.59 m (5.22 ft)
- Height: 1.89 m (6.2 ft)
- Crew: 6
- Shell: Fixed QF 85×708mm R
- Caliber: 85 mm
- Carriage: split trail
- Elevation: -6° to 35°
- Traverse: 54°
- Rate of fire: up to 15 rounds per minute (max); 8 rounds per minute (normal)
- Muzzle velocity: 1040 m/s
- Effective firing range: 1200 m
- Maximum firing range: 18.97 km (11.8 mi)
- Sights: OP-2-77; OP-4-77

The 85-mm antitank gun D-48 (Russian: 85-мм противотанковая пушка Д-48) was a Soviet 85-mm calibre anti-tank gun used after World War II. It was designed as the replacement for the 100 mm field gun M1944 (BS-3). Distinguishing features of the D-48 include a very long barrel and a pepper-pot muzzle brake. The D-48 was itself replaced in the 1960s by the T-12 antitank gun.

== Overview ==
The gun was designed by the F. F. Petrov Design Bureau on the basis of the D-44 85-mm divisional gun and production of the D-48 began in 1953 at the No. 75 factory in Yurga. The D-48 used the breechblock from the BS-3 100-mm field gun in order to achieve a rate of fire of 15 rounds per minute at maximum cadence. The gun can transition from march to combat order in about two minutes.

The D-48N was a version with an APN 2-77 or 3-77 infrared imaging device fitted for night combat. A licensed version of the D-48 was produced in China as the Type 60.

The gun fires a high velocity armor-piercing-capped-ballistic-cap tracer (APCBC-T) BR-372 Projectile at 1040 meters per second and can penetrate 185mm of armor at a range of 1000 meters at an angle of obliquity of 90 degrees. The 3BK-7 high explosive antitank (HEAT) projectile can penetrate 192mm of armor at an angle of obliquity of 60 degrees. The effective range of armor-piercing shells for the D-48 is 1,230 meters (HVAP-T) or 940 meters (HEAT). Additionally, the D-48 antitank gun is capable of firing a 9.66 kilogram OF-372 high explosive projectile to a direct fire range of 1,200 meters or an indirect fire range of 18.97 kilometers. The Ammunition for the D-48 was developed by necking down 100-mm ammunition in order to achieve higher muzzle velocities.

The gun is towed by a URAL-375D truck or an AT-P tractor with a maximum towing speed over asphalt roadway of about 60 km/h. The tires on the D-48 are those of the ZIS-5 truck.

Designs with auxiliary power units were also investigated but never developed beyond prototype stage.

Performance of D-48 and comparable weapons
Effectiveness against rolled homogeneous armor
Weapon	Muzzle Velocity, meters per second	Penetration in mm
85 mm D-48 (firing BR-372 APCBC)	1040	195 (at 90°, range 1000 meters)
8.8 cm PaK 43 (firing PzGr 40/43 APCR)	1200	228 (at 90°, range 1000 meters)
90 mm M3 (firing M304 APCR)	1021	173 (at 30°, range 914 meters)
These data are not directly comparable as various measurement methods are used. They are, however, illustrative of the relative performance of the weapons.

== Use by other nations ==
The D-48 has been exported to Afghanistan, Bulgaria, Congo, India, Iraq, North Korea, Mongolia, Mozambique, Romania, Somalia, Sudan, Syria and Vietnam.
