= Yurga Machine-Building Plant =

Defense manufacturer in Yurga, Kemerovo Oblast, Russia

Coordinates: 55°43′57″N 84°54′32″E

- Company type: Private limited company
- Industry: Arms industry
- Founded: 1943
- Headquarters: Yurga, Russia
- Parent: Uralvagonzavod
- Website: yumz.ru

Yurga Machine-Building Plant (Russian: Юргинский машиностроительный завод) is a company based in Yurga, Kemerovo Oblast, Russia. Since 2015 it is part of Uralvagonzavod.

Yurga Machine-Building Plant produces missile launchers for the Russian Strategic Rocket Forces and equipment for the Russian Army. It is the largest industrial entity in Yurga.

The plant was established in September 1941, from the evacuated workers and machinery of the New Kramatorsk Machinebuilding Factory, the Bolshevik Plant of Leningrad and the Barrikady Plant of Stalingrad.
