= China Lake grenade launcher =

China Lake pump-action grenade launcher
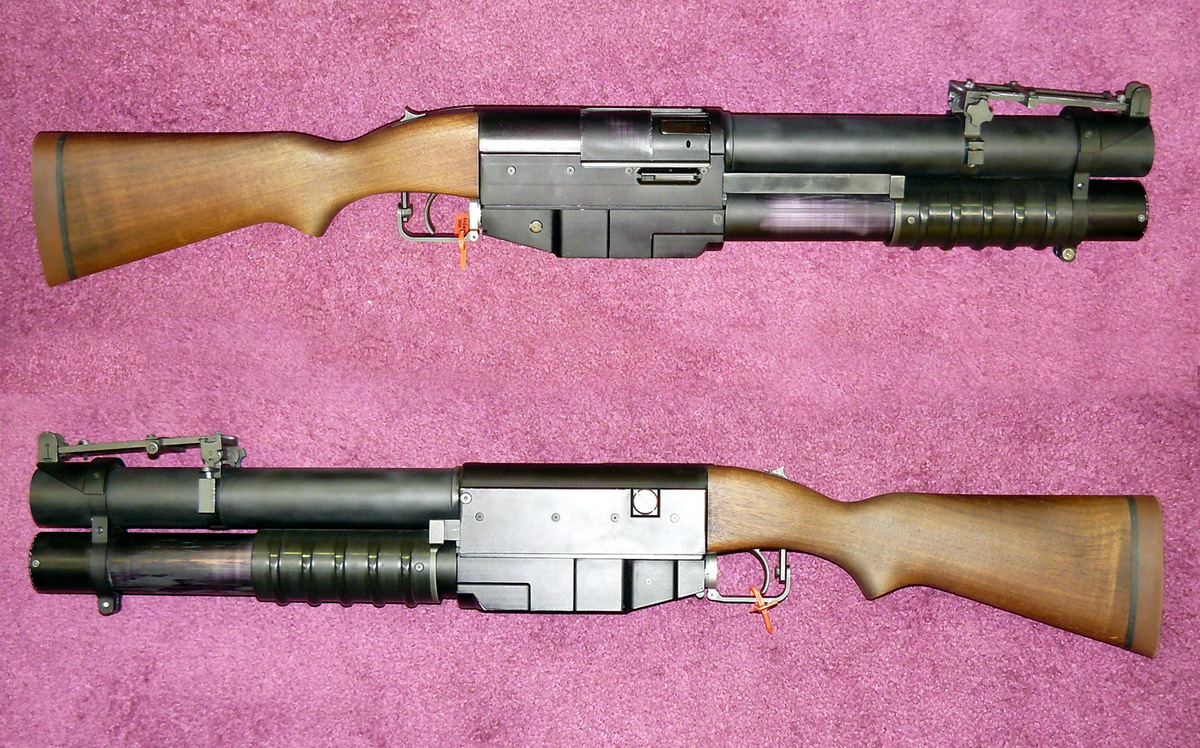
- CSG/Trident Reproduction China Lake Grenade Launcher
- Type: Grenade launcher
- Place of origin: United States

Service history
- In service: 1967–1968 NAWS 2003–2009 Trident/Airtronic
- Used by: See Users
- Wars: Vietnam War

Production history
- Designer: Alfred F. Kermode
- Designed: 1967
- Manufacturer: Naval Air Weapons Station (NAWS) China Lake Facility
- Produced: 1968 Naval Air Weapons Station (NAWS), 2007-2009 Airtronic/Trident, 2003-2009 CSG/Trident
- No. built: 25 to 30

Specifications
- Mass: 4.63 kg (10.21 lb) loaded 3.72 kg (8.2 lb) empty
- Length: 876.3 mm (34.50 in)
- Barrel length: 368.3 mm (14.5 in)
- Cartridge: 40x46mm
- Action: Pump-action
- Rate of fire: 30 rounds/min
- Muzzle velocity: 76 m/s (249 ft/s)
- Effective firing range: 350 meters
- Maximum firing range: 437 Yards / 400 Meters
- Feed system: 3-round tubular magazine (+1 in the chamber)
- Sights: Open, rear sight is the M79 ladder elevation sight system marked 375 meter ladder, front is a M79 square-notch/blade

The China Lake pump-action grenade launcher or NATIC is a pump-action grenade launcher that was developed by the Special Projects Division of the Naval Air Weapons Station China Lake, which provided equipment to United States Navy SEALs.

== History ==
The M79 and XM148 grenade launchers were single-shot, and the repeating T148E1 grenade launcher was unreliable, so a request was made to China Lake engineers. Navy SEAL teams were pleased with the resultant pump-action grenade launcher. The tubular magazine held three 40x46mm grenades, and so with one grenade in the chamber, four grenades could be fired rapidly before reloading. In fact, a skilled operator could fire four aimed shots before the first one landed. The grenade launcher was extremely light for its size, since a significant portion of it was made of aluminium.

The pump-action grenade launcher features leaf iron sights similar to the M79. The front sight is a fixed square notch. Depending on if the leaf is folded or not, the rear square notch is either fixed or adjustable from 75 to 400 m in 25 m increments. The larger screw on the left side of the receiver was designed for a quadrant sight to be mounted.

Sources differ as to how many weapons were produced. One claims that between 20 and 30 were made. However, according to another source, only 16 were made. The highest original receiver number found is 50, but it may never have been made into a functional weapon. SEAL historian Kevin Dockery has confirmed 22 completed guns being carried on Navy records. Only three originals currently remain under US Navy control; the rest have been demilitarized. Submitted for field trials in Vietnam, this weapon apparently performed quite well with HE-Frag ammunition.

The China Lake Model is sometimes mistakenly referred to as the "EX-41" or as the "China Lake NATIC". The EX-41 was a design prototype created in the mid-1990s based upon the earlier China Lake Model pump 40mm. The EX-41 was only produced as a single prototype as a follow-up design created two decades after the China Lake Model was produced. The China Lake NATIC designation is also erroneous as the weapon was never known by that designation. Since it was made on an ad hoc basis for special operations forces, it was not formally adopted and has no official military designation. Thus the SEALs referred to the experimental weapon as the "China Lake grenade launcher" in reference to the facility which produced it.

Five remaining original China Lake Model grenade launchers are on display in museums. Serial number 4 is at the National Navy UDT-SEAL Museum in Fort Pierce, Florida while serial number 13 is on display in the War Remnants Museum in Ho Chi Minh City, Vietnam. Serial number 2 is stored at the Naval History and Heritage Command in Washington DC. An additional launcher is on limited display in a military restricted US Navy facility at NSWC Crane. Another is in Technical Museum, Hanoi, serial number is unknown.

== Improvements and contracts ==
An effort to produce an improved version of the weapon began in 1992 when Samuel "Dutch" Hillenburg, a firearms writer specializing in military weapons, teamed up with master machinist Brian Fauci. In 2003, they achieved a breakthrough and were able to convince fellow writer and firearms enthusiast Captain Monty Mendenhall to finance their research effort. By 2004, they had a functional prototype and had formed Trident Enterprises Ltd. to continue their work on the project under government patent.

Brian Fauci sold his improved upon military demonstration CSG/Trident China Lake Grenade Launchers to private parties after the contract for a Marine Corps replacement Grenade Launcher was cancelled in October 2009 with the selection of the M32.

By 2009 Trident created nine China Lake reproduction launcher receivers. These launchers were separate from the ten Trident launchers connected to the Airtronic deal. The CSG/Trident China Lake launchers have increased reliability and improved cycling of action compared to the original. CSG also replaced most flat headed screws with hex headed screws. The butt stock recoil pads are filled solid on the CSG launchers instead of ventilated for padding as on the original China Lake launchers. No sling studs or swivels were installed initially on the Trident launchers, although they have threading for the installation of sling swivels.

Manufacturing metals were upgraded with improved hardness treatments and metallurgy since the original China Lake development with both the Airtronic/Trident and CSG/Trident launchers. There are a total of nine privately owned China Lake grenade launchers accounted for inside the United States, plus the four original China Lake grenade launchers from the NAWS, which remain in only museums.

== 2007-2009 U.S. Defense Contract ==
In June 2007, China Lake launchers were in limited production by two different companies offering the reproduction launchers to the U.S. military by way of defense contracts. At that time, the U.S. Military was approached with an offer from Airtronic USA (then the current government manufacturer of the M203, having succeeded Colt) to acquire a license for military production and sales. Both CSG and Airtronic/Trident launchers were considered for replacement of the M79 stand-alone launcher in the Marine Corps.

In July 2007, Airtronic USA announced that they were entering large-scale production with an initial order of 500 units for US military forces. This announcement occurred simultaneously with a demonstration of the CSG/Trident China Lake launcher in an episode of the popular military technology program, "Weaponology".

From 2007-2009 contractor and manufacturer Airtronic USA invested over two million dollars with Trident for a contract to reproduce the China Lake Launcher's original design and a more modular design (information provided by Marriellen Kett, president of Airtronic USA). These improvements include a M203 handguard, M4 carbine-style collapsible stock and barrel with a top Picatinny rail for accessories, and extended the magazine tube to fit four grenades plus one in the chamber.

The two companies involved (Airtronic and Trident) parted ways after legal action. During this the U.S.M.C adopted the Milkor M32 Grenade Launcher as a replacement, essentially ending any further development of the China Lake launcher.

== Price ==
Of the original 1967-1969 NAWS manufactured China Lake Grenade Launchers, none are known to be under private ownership. The Trident/CSG China Lake Grenade Launchers from the 2009 defense contract are the last nine known legal launchers to be in private hands and are valued over $80,000 USD based on past auctions. The nine CSG/Trident patented contract China Lake launchers are transferable as a Destructive Device in the United States.

== Patented ==
All CSG/Trident China Lake Grenade Launchers remaining in registry can be considered of extreme rarity. Note: Filed Sept. 1, 1967 Alfred F. Kermode holding patent 3,435,549 PUMP TYPE TUBULAR MAGAZINE REPEATING FIREARM was transferred to and held with the U.S. Gov and Filed under April 1, 1969 to the U.S. Patent office. No other China Lake reproductions are allowed unless approved by the U.S. Government for direct defense contract to the U.S. Government. V. C. Muller Attorney. U.S. Patent Office.

== Users ==
- United States
  - Navy SEALs
  - United States Marine Corps Force Reconnaissance
  - 5th Special Forces Group of the Army Green Berets

== See also ==
- EX 41 grenade launcher
- M79 grenade launcher
- M203 grenade launcher
- M32 grenade Launcher
- M320 grenade launcher
- Mk 19 grenade launcher
- GM-94 grenade launcher
- Brügger & Thomet GL06
