= Operation Sam Houston =

Part of the Vietnam War (1967)

- Part of the Vietnam War
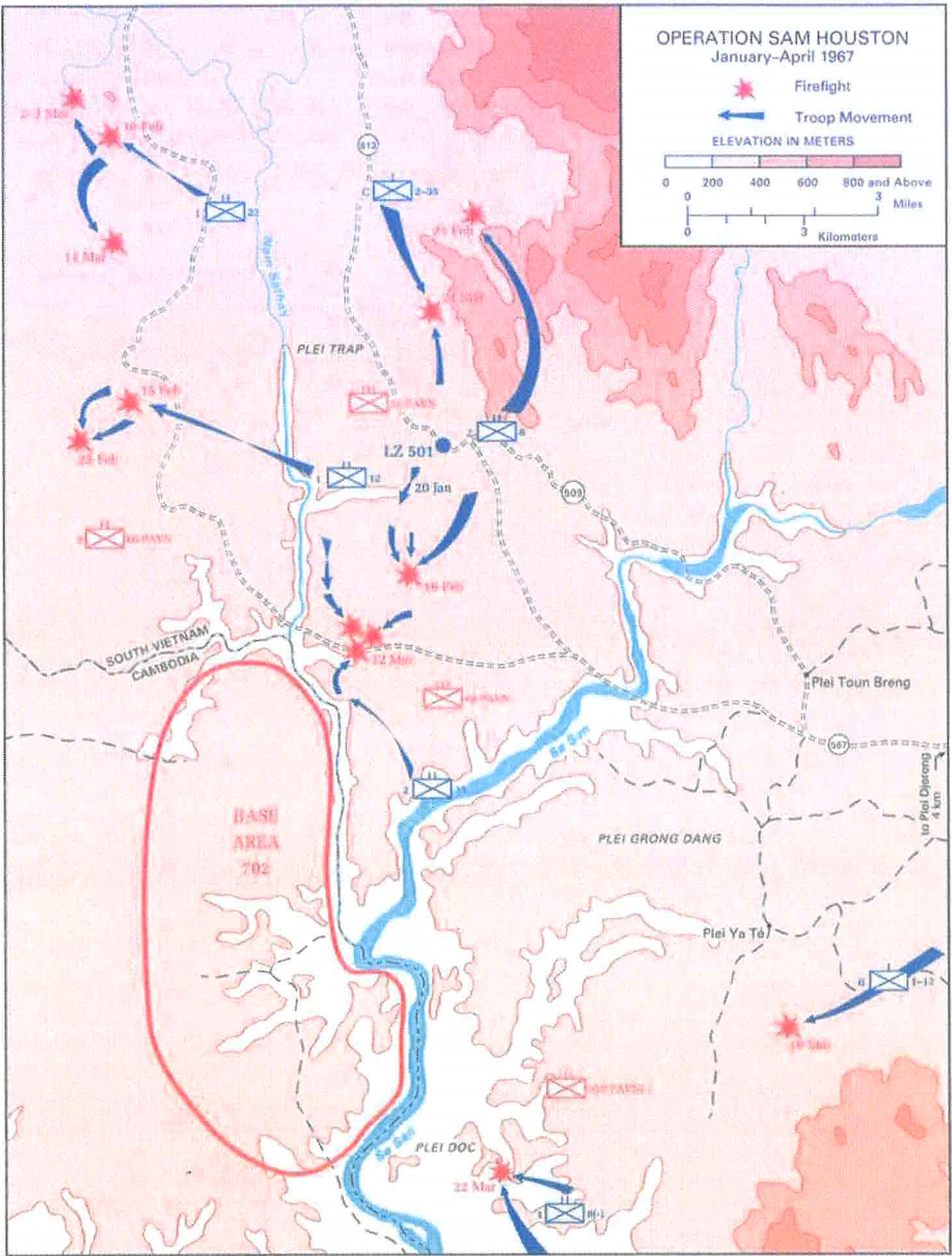
- Operation Sam Houston, January–April 1967
| Date | 12 February – 5 April 1967 |
| Location | Plei Trap Valley and Plei Doc, South Vietnam 14.075°N 107.39°E |
| Result | Inconclusive |

Belligerents
| United States | North Vietnam |

Commanders and leaders
| MG William R. Peers; COL James B. Adamson | Unknown |

Units involved
| 4th Infantry Division: 1st Brigade; 2nd Brigade | 32nd Regiment; 66th Regiment; 88th Regiment; 95B Regiment |

Casualties and losses
| 155 killed | US body count: 733 killed |

Operation Sam Houston was a US Army operation that took place in the Plei Trap Valley and around Plei Doc, lasting from 12 February to 5 April 1967.

== Prelude ==
In early February 1967, intelligence reported that the People's Army of Vietnam (PAVN) 1st Division was operating in the Plei Trap Valley near the Vietnam-Cambodia border and the 10th Division was believed to also be nearby. The area of the operation was described as being "an area of almost continuous jungle with hardwood trees of several varieties up to six or seven feet in diameter and 200-250 feet in height. Where sunlight can break through the overhead canopy, the jungle floor is covered with thick, dense undergrowth restricting observation to a few meters and making movement extremely difficult. The area represents some of the most difficult jungle terrain in all of Southeast Asia. It is intersected by valleys and mountains with elevations varying from about 500 to nearly 600 feet, presenting additional difficulties to movement and maneuver."

== Operation ==
On 12 February, the 2nd Brigade, 4th Infantry Division deployed two Battalions by helicopter into the Plei Trap Valley to establish operating bases. On 14 February Company C 1st Battalion, 12th Infantry Regiment (1-12th Infantry) discovered a series of new unoccupied bunkers near its landing zone (LZ) 501 North. The following morning Company C was engaged by PAVN forces who attempted to overrun the landing zone, but the attack was repulsed by air strikes and artillery fire. On 16 February as the rest of the 1-12th Infantry was being landed by helicopter they were fired on by the PAVN 8th Battalion, 66th Regiment, damaging 8 UH-1 Hueys. The PAVN continued to attack the LZ into the night but disengaged before dawn on 16 February.

On the morning of 16 February, a platoon of the 2nd Battalion, 8th Infantry Regiment (2-8th Infantry) which was patrolling east of the Plei Trap was ambushed by the PAVN 32nd Regiment and forced to withdraw with gunship and artillery support. Inside the Plei Trap a company of the 22nd Infantry Regiment chased several PAVN soldiers who led them into an ambush and were unable to disengage until nightfall.

By the end of 16 February, the 2nd Brigade had lost 55 dead and 74 wounded, while the PAVN had lost almost 300 by body count. Concerned about the high casualties, MG Peers ordered the units to stay near their bases for the next five days while the area was hit by artillery and air strikes, including nine by B-52s. Peers also received reinforcement by the 1st Brigade, 4th Infantry Division.

On 21 February, a patrolling company from 2-8th Infantry was engaged by a PAVN heavy weapons position. US losses were 7 killed and 34 wounded, while PAVN losses were 43 killed.

On 25 February, Company A 1-12th Infantry in the Plei Trap detected a PAVN ambush and called in airstrikes killing 48 PAVN and leaving three wounded behind for the loss of one US soldier killed.

On 27 February, a US reconnaissance patrol from 1-12th Infantry was mistakenly inserted into Cambodia. The patrol killed two PAVN soldiers and observed numerous others before being extracted.

On 2 March, a PAVN mortar attack on a 1-12th Infantry position killed two US soldiers and wounded two others.

On 12 March, a company of the 2nd Battalion, 35th Infantry Regiment (2-35th Infantry) patrolling in the Plei Trap came under fire from a PAVN bunker complex. Two more companies were landed by helicopter but were quickly pinned down. As night fell the US force came under mortar fire from Cambodia, as flares illuminated the battlefield, the Americans observed that the PAVN were crossing the Se San river into Cambodia and helicopter gunships were called to attack the disengaging PAVN. By the following morning the PAVN had left the area leaving 51 dead, while US casualties were 14 dead and 46 wounded.

On 13 March the PAVN launched a mortar attack on LZ 3 Tango in the Plei Trap, hitting it with over 300 rounds, killing 1 US soldier, wounding 87 and damaging 25 vehicles.

On 16 March, the 2nd Brigade air-assaulted into the area of Plei Doc (14.019°N 107.41°E), approximately 15 kilometres northwest of the Đức Cơ Camp. As the UH-1s carrying the 1-12th Infantry landed the PAVN triggered several command detonated mines destroying one UH-1D and damaging seven others and killing 5 US troops and wounding 13 others. The PAVN then engaged the infantry with rifle and machine gun fire before breaking contact as US air and artillery fire was brought to bear, leaving 10 dead.

Also on 21 March, a long-range reconnaissance patrol from 1-8th Infantry operating near the Cambodian border lost radio contact with its headquarters and on 22 March Companies A and B 1-8th Infantry were sent to locate them. The US companies encountered a Battalion of the PAVN 95B Regiment and withstood several assaults before the PAVN withdrew into Cambodia leaving 136 dead. US casualties were 27 killed and 48 wounded.

With the change of focus of the operation from the Plei Trap valley to Plei Doc and believing that the PAVN had left the area, the 1st Brigade began withdrawing from the Plei Trap. On 21 March a PAVN force ambushed Company C 2-35th Infantry in the Plei Trap killing 22 Americans and wounding 53 for the loss of 18 dead. Despite this evidence of continued PAVN presence and given the oncoming rainy season, MG Peers continued the withdrawal and 1st Brigade had left the valley by 28 March replacing the 2nd Brigade in Plei Doc.

The operation finally concluded on 5 April 1967.

== Aftermath ==
Operation Sam Houston appeared to end inconclusively like Operation Paul Revere IV in the same area. Total US casualties were 155 killed, while PAVN losses were 733 killed (body count).

The PAVN were always able to control the place and timing of the fighting, withdrawing to their sanctuaries in Cambodia when American pressure became too great. Most of the engagements of the operation occurred within five kilometres of the Cambodian border. Rather than keeping large forces close to the Cambodian border, MG Peers decided to move his Battalions back from the border area which going forward would be patrolled by long-range reconnaissance patrols.

The PAVN had developed effective tactics of "hugging" the US forces to reduce the effectiveness of B-52 strikes which could not take place within a safety margin of three kilometres of friendly positions.

During the operation the XM148 grenade launcher was field-tested and found to be difficult to load in combat, while the XM576 40mm grenade was tested and found to be very effective for jungle use.
