= EX 41 grenade launcher =

EX 41
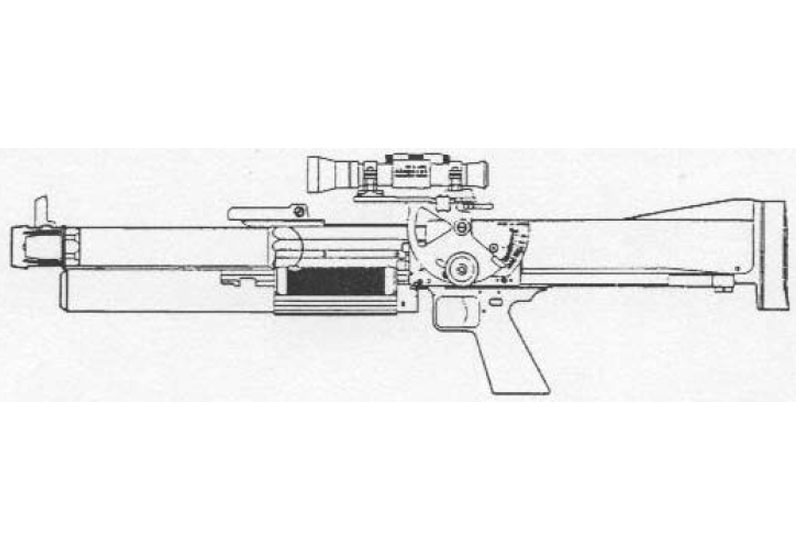
- Type: Grenade launcher
- Place of origin: United States

Specifications
- Mass: 9.98 kg
- Length: 914 mm
- Height: 279 mm
- Cartridge: Hybrid design 40mm grenade combining elements of both low pressure and high pressure rounds.
- Action: Pump-action
- Muzzle velocity: 152 m/s
- Maximum firing range: 1,500 m
- Feed system: 4-round internal tube magazine

The EX 41 grenade launcher, also called the Shoulder-Fired Weapon (SFW), was a prototype multi-shot grenade launcher that was never adopted by the United States military. Most of its development was at Naval Ordnance Station Louisville for the US Marine Corps in order to replace the single-shot M203. NOS Louisville had previously developed the Mk 19 and Mk 20 multi-shot grenade launchers. The Picatinny Arsenal also aided in the EX 41's development as part of the Army's Bursting Munitions Technology program. In its final form, the EX 41 was intended to weigh as little as 6.8 kg and have a range of up to 1500 m. The program never progressed beyond a single prototype and in November 1995, the design was sent to Knight's Armament Company for further development.

Instead of the standard low-velocity 40×46mm grenade used by the M203 and M79 grenade launchers or the standard high-velocity 40×53mm grenade used by the Mk 19, the EX 41 used a hybrid of the two developed by Indiana Ordnance. High-velocity ammunition such as the M430 HEDP and M918 practice grenades were fitted to the low-velocity cartridge cases, in order to have a longer effective range with a lower recoil. An optical sight of unknown manufacture was added to the top of the receiver to take advantage of the extended range of the ammunition.

The sole remaining prototype is in the possession of Knight's Armament Company and the Institute of Military Technology. In a 2020 interview with former R&D VP Doug Olsen, Trey Knight remarked on the EX 41 program with great disdain. Knight described the EX 41 as being extremely uncomfortable to shoot. He compared firing it to, "Like being punched in the face... No one wanted to fire it for very long." After discussing the engineering difficulties and use of non-standard 40mm rounds, Knight and Olsen agreed that the program was, "Pretty dangerous."
