= M79 grenade launcher =

Launcher, Grenade, 40 mm, M79
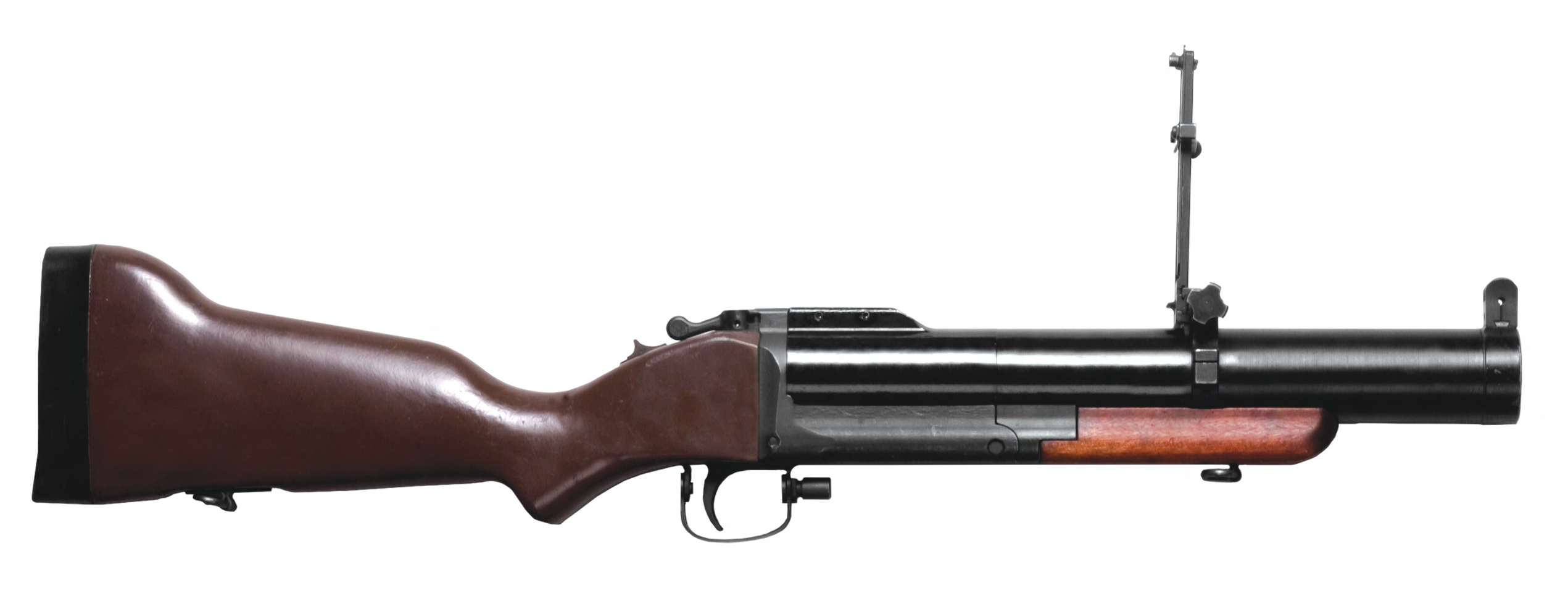
- M79 with the ladder-type sights unfolded.
- Type: Grenade launcher
- Place of origin: United States

Service history
- In service: 1961–present
- Used by: See Users
- Wars: Vietnam War; Cambodian Civil War; Laotian Civil War; Communist insurgency in Thailand; Dominican Civil War; Communist Insurgency War; The Troubles; Operation Marajoara; Lebanese Civil War; South African Border War; Sino-Vietnamese War; Salvadoran Civil War; Falklands War; Bougainville conflict War in Afghanistan (2001–2021); Iraq War; Gulf War; Desert Storm; Sistan and Baluchestan insurgency 2008–2011 Cambodia–Thailand border crisis 2010 Burma border clashes Syrian Civil War; Battle of Marawi; Myanmar Civil War

Production history
- Designer: Springfield Armory
- Designed: 1953–1960
- Manufacturer: Springfield Armory, Action Manufacturing Company, Kanarr Corporation, and Thompson-Ramo-Wooldridge
- Produced: 1961–1971 (U.S.)
- No. built: 350,000 (U.S. only)

Specifications
- Mass: 2.93 kg (6.45 lb) loaded 2.7 kg (5.95 lb) empty
- Length: 73.1 cm (28.78 in)
- Barrel length: 35.56 cm (14 in)
- Cartridge: 40×46mm grenade
- Action: Break-action
- Rate of fire: Depends on the speed of the operator
- Muzzle velocity: 76 m/s (247 ft/s)
- Effective firing range: 350 m (383 yd)
- Maximum firing range: 400 m (437 yd)
- Feed system: Breech-loaded
- Sights: Blade and leaf type

The M79 grenade launcher is a single-shot, shoulder-fired, break-action grenade launcher that fires a 40×46mm grenade, which uses what the US Army calls the High-Low Propulsion System to keep recoil forces low, and first appeared during the Vietnam War. Its distinctive report has earned it colorful nicknames such as "Thumper," "Thump-Gun," "Bloop Tube," "Big Ed," "Elephant Gun," and "Blooper" among American soldiers as well as "Can Cannon" in reference to the grenade size; Australian units referred to it as the "Wombat Gun", while British soldiers adopted the "Elephant Gun" moniker. The M79 can fire a wide variety of 40 mm rounds including explosive, anti-personnel, smoke, buckshot, flechette (pointed steel projectiles with a vaned tail for stable flight), and illumination. While largely replaced by the M203, the M79 has remained in service in many units worldwide in niche roles.

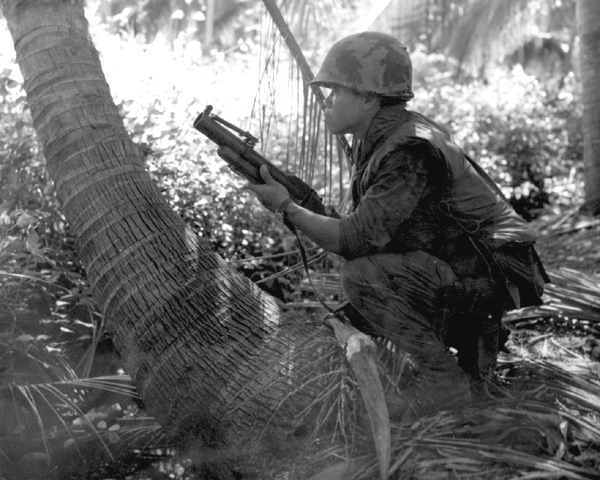
A soldier of the Royal Thai Army Volunteer Regiment (Queen's Cobras) armed with a M79 conducts a search and sweep mission in Phuoc Tho, South Vietnam, December 1967.

== History ==
The M79 was a result of the US Army's Project Niblick, an attempt to increase firepower for the infantryman by having an explosive projectile more accurate with further range than rifle grenades, but more portable than a mortar. Project Niblick created the 40 × 46 mm grenade, but was unable to create a satisfactory launcher for it that could fire more than a single shot. One of the launchers at Springfield Armory was the three-shot "harmonica" T148 (not to be confused with the later, underbarrel XM148), which did see some limited production and fielding in Vietnam, but problems with the three-round magazine prevented widespread acceptance. The other design was a single-shot break-open, shoulder-fired weapon, the S-3. This was refined into the S-5, which resembled an oversized single-barrel shotgun. Unable to solve the problems with the multi-shot T148 launcher, the Army adopted the S-5 as the XM79. With a new sight, the XM79 was officially adopted as the M79 on December 15, 1960.

In 1961, the first M79 grenade launchers were delivered to the US Army. Owing to its ease of use, reliability, and firepower, the M79 became popular among American soldiers, who dubbed it "the platoon leader's artillery". Some soldiers would cut down the stock and barrel to make the M79 even more portable.

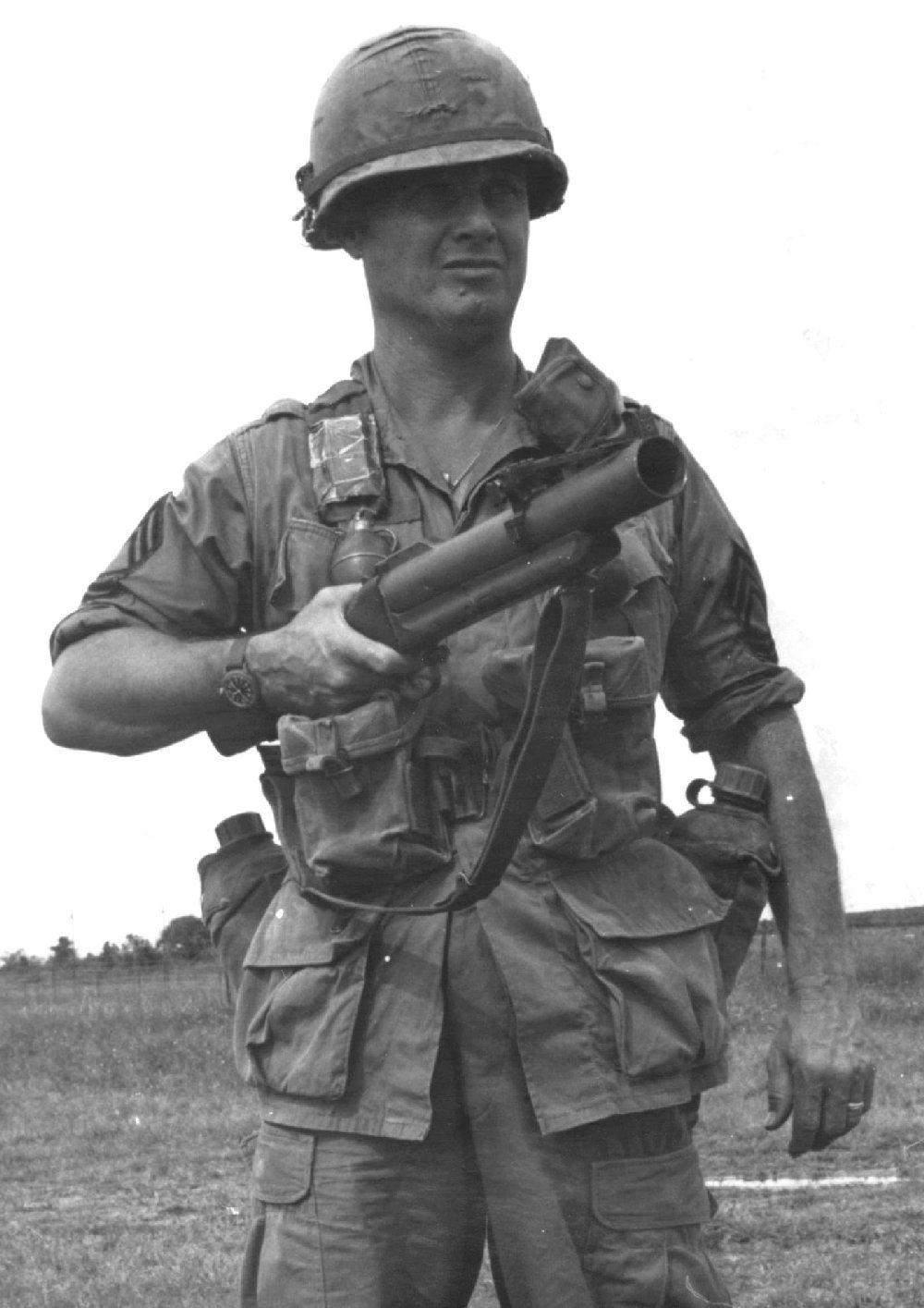
A US infantryman carrying the M79 in Vietnam

The M79 saw combat in the Vietnam War beginning in the early days, when M79 grenadiers assigned to major Army divisions first arrived to see combat in Vietnam in 1965, including the 1st Cavalry Division, the 1st Infantry Division, the 101st Airborne Division, and the 173rd Airborne Brigade. M79s were assigned to the specialist 4 grenadier in both 4-5-man fire teams organic to an Army rifle squad headed by a squad leader. The Marines assigned one grenadier to their three-fireteam 14-man rifle squad.

However, its single-shot nature was a serious drawback. Reloading after every shot meant a slow rate of fire and an inability to keep up a constant volume of fire during a firefight. This led the Navy to develop the China Lake Grenade Launcher, which was produced for deployed SEAL Teams. For close-in situations, the minimum arming range (the round travels 30 meters to arm itself) and the blast radius meant a grenadier had to use his .45 ACP (11.43 mm) M1911 pistol, or fire and hope that the grenade acted as a giant slow bullet. Special grenades for close-in fighting were created to compensate, though a soldier was not always able to load one in the heat of battle. Moreover, the size and weight of both the M79 and its ammunition meant that a grenadier armed with this weapon could not also carry a rifle, having only a sidearm to use in a firefight after expending his rounds. Some grenadiers did choose to carry a slung M16 rifle in lieu of a sidearm.

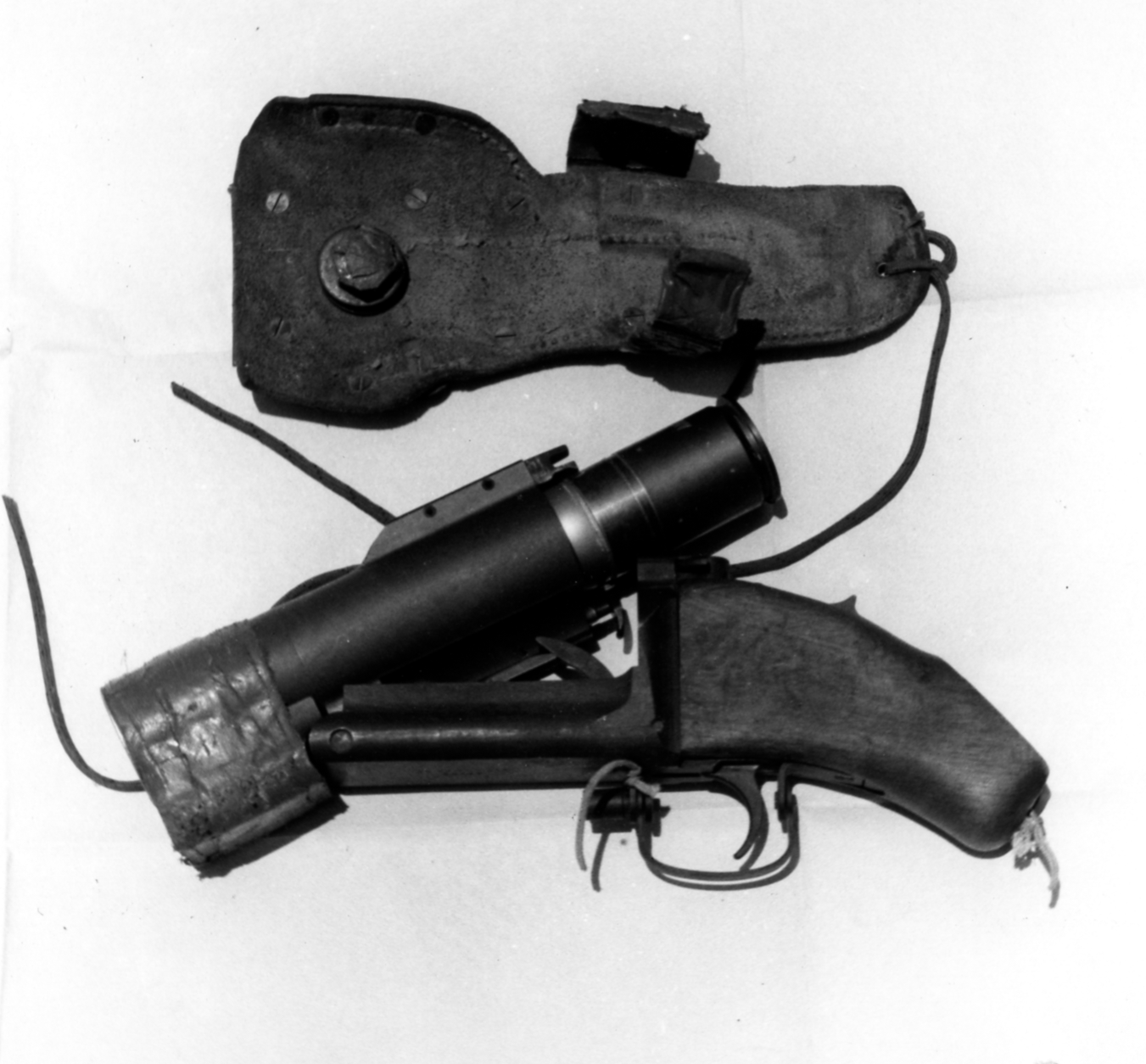
Cut-down M79 captured by Marines in 1968

Underbarrel grenade launchers, such as the XM148 and the M203, both designed as attachments for the M16 rifle, were developed during the Vietnam War, allowing the grenadier to also function as a rifleman. The XM148 was plagued with problems, and the project was dropped. The M203 was a success, and was standardized in 1969; it had replaced the M79 by the end of the war although M79s were still used in Reserve and National Guard units.

Some US Navy SEALs and Army Special Forces in Iraq were seen using the M79 due to its greater accuracy and range compared to the M203 (350 meters effective versus 150 meters effective). The M79 saw notable limited use during Operation Iraqi Freedom, such as for clearing IEDs. The grenade launcher also sees continued use as a mission-specific tool with Special warfare combatant-craft crewmen.

== Design ==
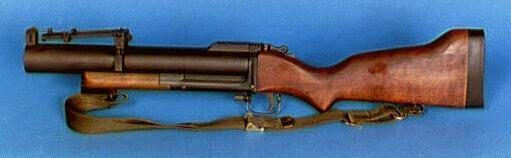
M79

Visually, the M79 grenade launcher resembles a large bore, break-action, sawed-off shotgun, and is simple in design, having only five major parts: a receiver group, a fore-end assembly, a barrel group, a sight assembly, and a stock. The fore-end assembly beds the barrel to the receiver. The stock is made out of wood or fiberglass. A rubber pad affixed to the buttstock absorbs some recoil. The front sight is a fixed blade. The rear sight on the M79 is a folding ladder–style leaf sight. When folded, the leaf sight acts as a fixed sight at close range. A grenadier may simply point and shoot with high accuracy. When unfolded, the leaf sight can be adjusted for ranges from 75 to 375 meters, in 25-meter increments. Additionally, Appendix A of the U.S. Army field manual for the M203 includes instructions on attaching the M16 rifle grenade sight to the M79's stock and marking the sling for indirect fire at elevations greater than 40°.

While not manufacturers of the M79, Milcor and Denel Mechem of South Africa do re-manufacture M79 grenade launchers to more modern standards. They replace the leaf sight with an optical one and replace the wooden stock with a modified R-4/R-5 stock.

== Operation ==
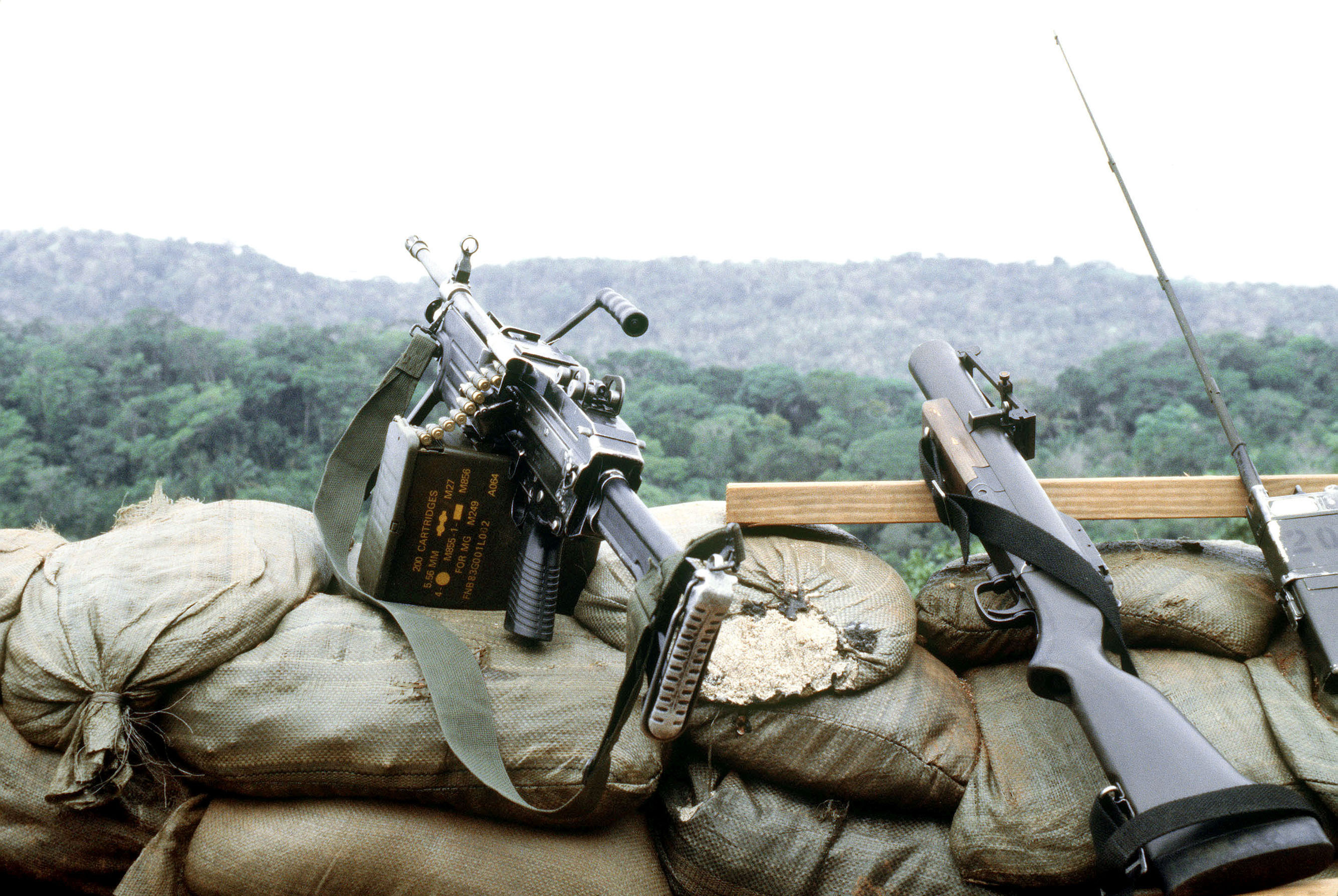
M79 (right) with an M249, Panama, January 1989.

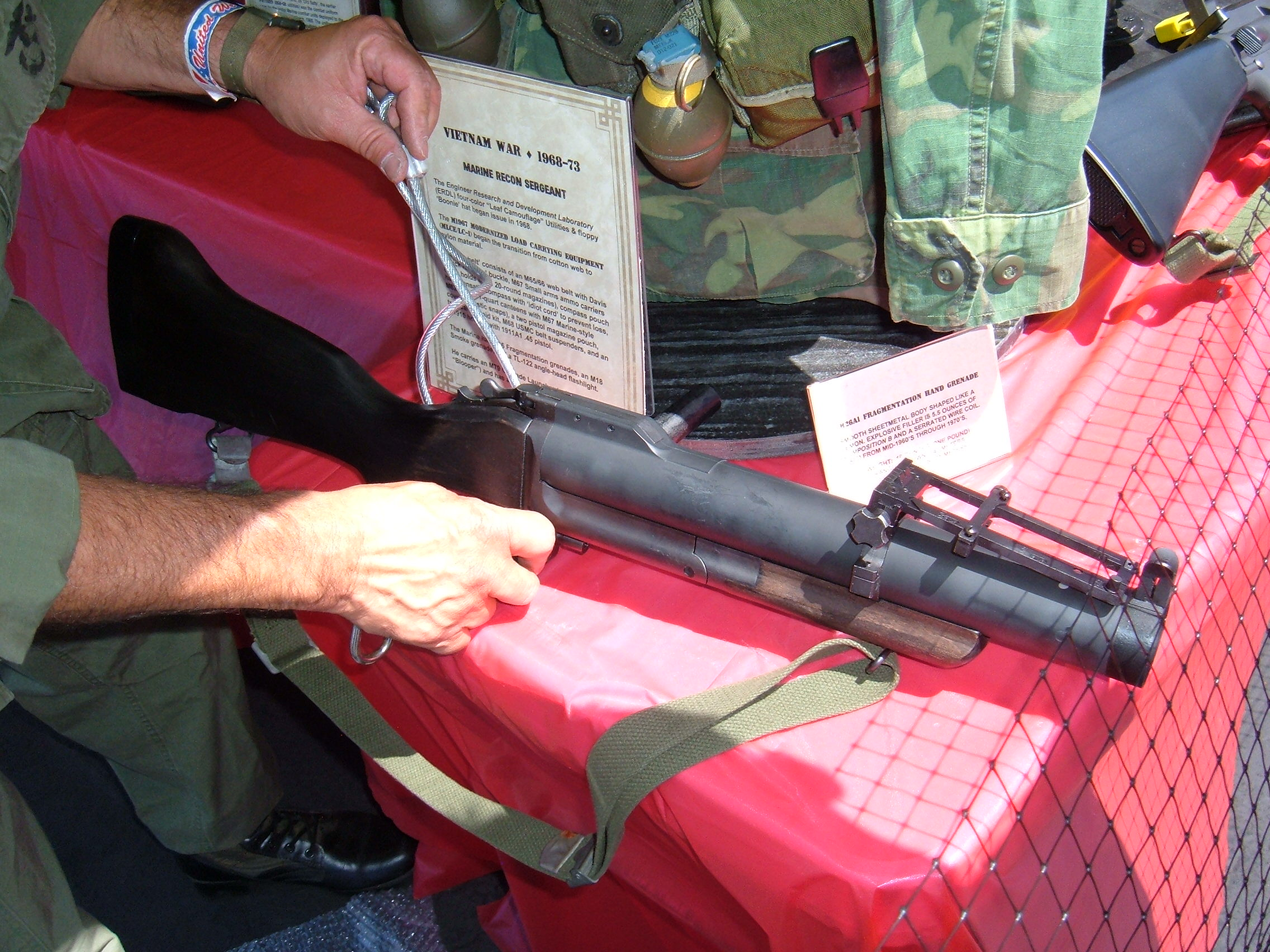
M79 being set up for display.

The M79 is easy to operate. To load, the grenadier pushes the barrel locking latch on the receiver group to the right. Gravity will pull down the barrel, opening the action and exposing the breech. The hammer is cocked when the breech is opened, and a spent casing may then be removed (if present) and a new round loaded. The break action must then be closed manually. Closing the breech will cause the barrel locking latch to return to center. The safety must then be pushed to the forward position in order to ready the weapon for firing.

== Ammunition ==
Many different ammunition types were produced for the M79 (and subsequently for the M203). Outside of the smoke and illumination rounds three main types emerge: explosive, close-range, and non-lethal crowd control. The break-open action of the M79 allows it to use longer rounds that the standard M203 cannot use without some difficulty.

=== Explosive ===
The M406 40 mm HE (high explosive) grenades fired from the M79 travel at a muzzle velocity of 75 meters per second. The M406 contained enough explosive to produce over 300 fragments that travel at 1,524 meters per second within a lethal radius of 5 meters. This round incorporated a spin-activation safety feature which prevents the grenade from arming while still within range of the shooter; it armed itself after traveling a distance of about 14–27 meters. The round would not arm at point blank ranges and it usually did not have enough kinetic energy to kill, although it sometimes penetrated the abdomen or caused large hematomas.

=== Close range ===
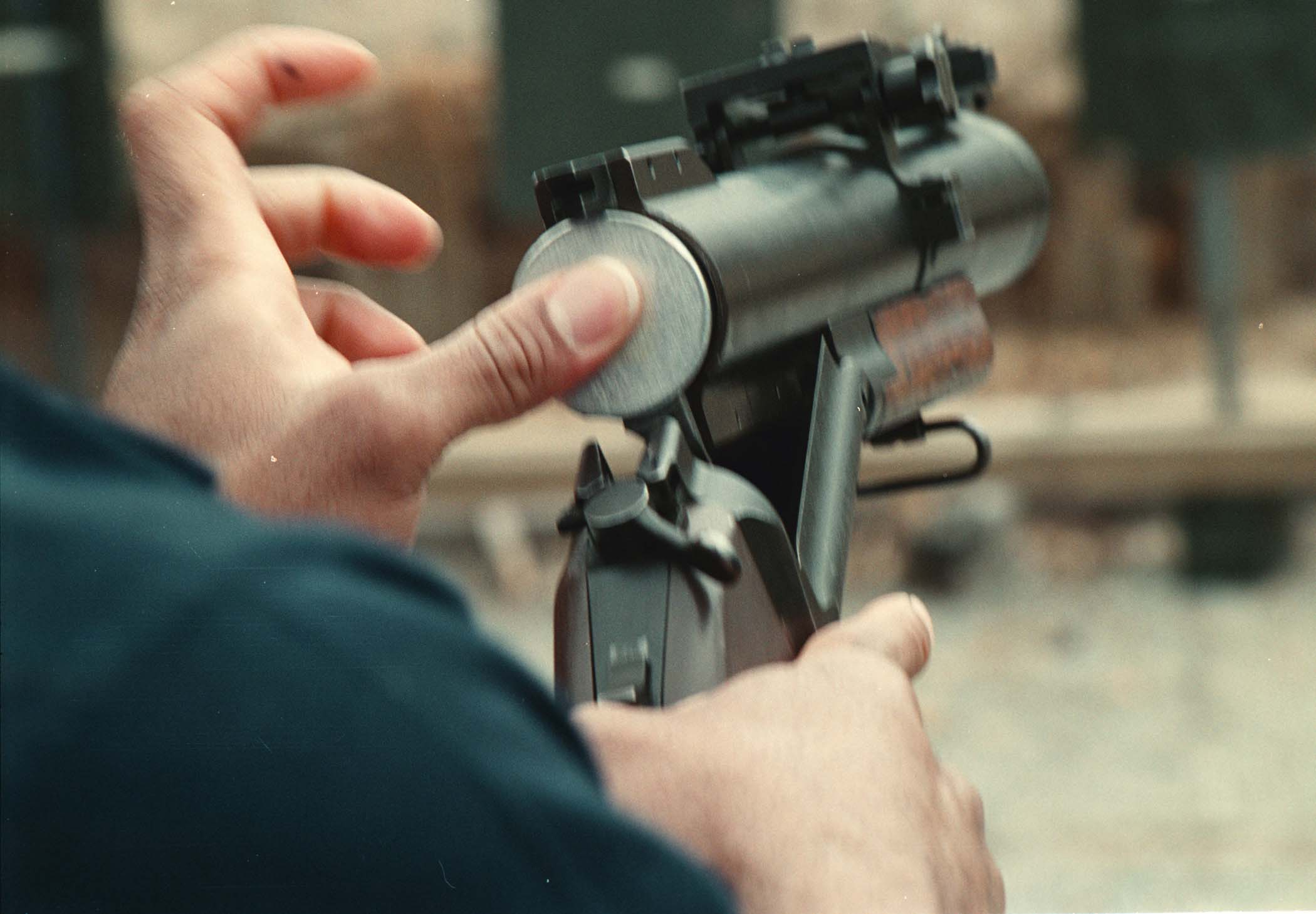
A less-lethal round is loaded into an M79

For close range fighting, two styles of M79 rounds were developed. The first was a flechette or Bee Hive round (so named for the sound the flechettes made while in flight) that fired 45 10-grain steel flechettes. Flechettes proved to be ineffective because they would often not hit point-first and penetrate. Instead they would hit sideways and bounce off. In 1966, this was replaced by the M576 buckshot round. Containing twenty 24-grain metal pellets (M576E1) or twenty-seven 24-grain metal pellets (M576E2), this round could be devastating at close ranges. However, as range increased, the shot spread out so rapidly as to be ineffective. The M576E2, despite the greater number of shot, was less effective at range than the M576E1, because its shot spread out much more quickly and could completely miss the target.

=== Non-lethal ===
The M79 has been used extensively also for crowd control purposes where it is desirable to have a weapon dedicated solely to non-lethal force. The three common less-lethal rounds are the M651 CS gas, the M1006 sponge grenade, and the M1029 Crowd Dispersal rounds.

== Users ==
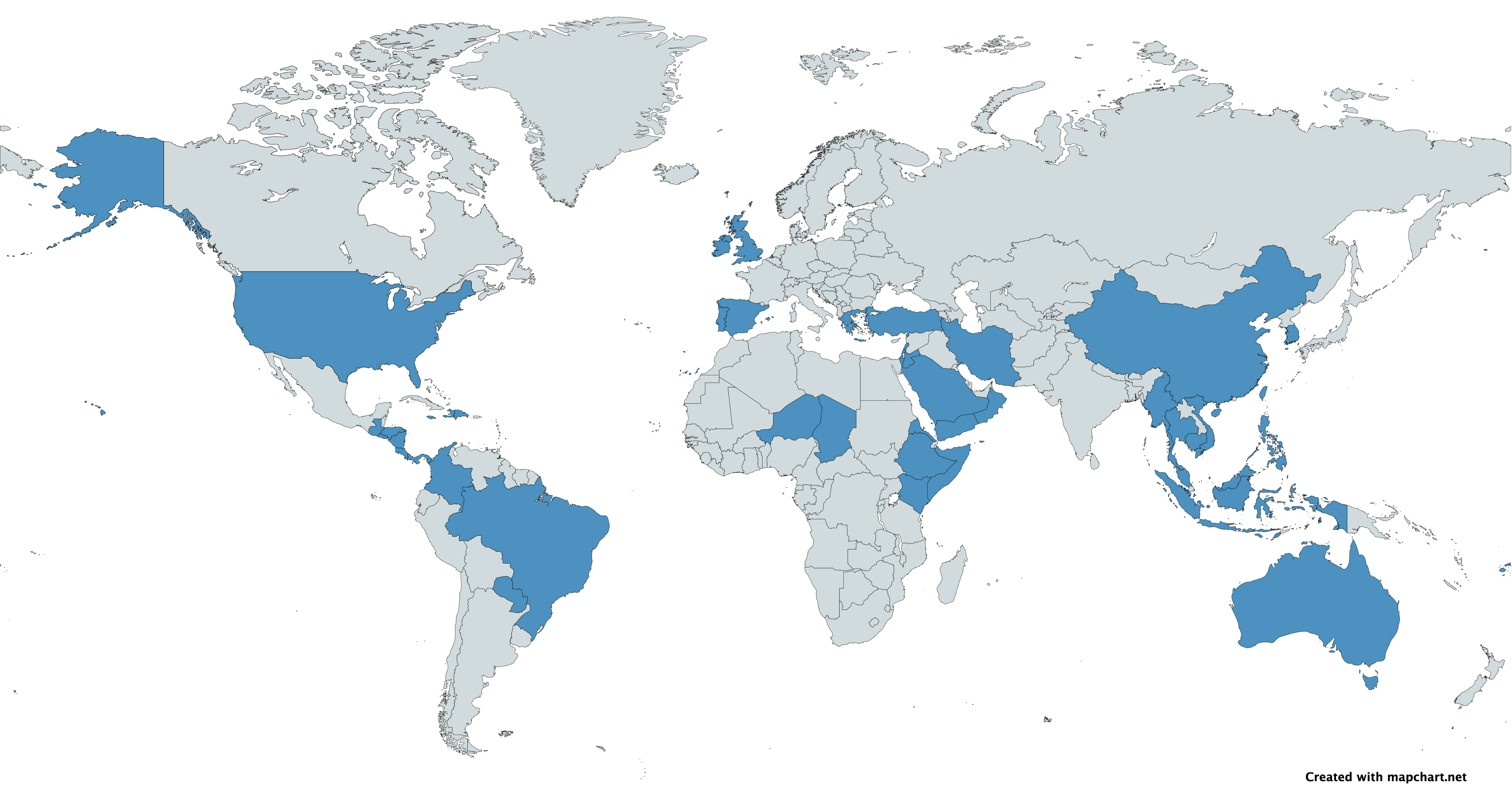
Map with M79 grenade launcher users in blue

- Australia
- Brazil: Used by the Brazilian Army.
- Cambodia
- Chad
- China: Grenade launcher captured and used in Sino-Vietnamese War and Sino-Vietnamese conflicts
- Colombia
- Costa Rica
- Dominican Republic: Used by the Dominican Army.
- El Salvador
- Eritrea
- Ethiopia
- Fiji
- Greece
- Guatemala
- Haiti
- Honduras
- Indonesia
- Iran
- Ireland
- Israel
- Jamaica: Jamaica Defence Force.
- Jordan
- Kenya
- Iraq
  - Iraqi Kurdistan – Peshmerga
- Laos
- Lebanon
- Malaysia
- Myanmar
- New Zealand
- Nicaragua
- Niger
- Oman
- Paraguay
- Panama: Panama Defense Force
- Philippines
- Portugal
- Saint Vincent and the Grenadines
- Saudi Arabia
- Somalia
- South Africa: Used by 32 Battalion operators.
- South Korea: Manufactured by S&T Daewoo under license as KM79.
- Spain
- Taiwan
- Thailand
- Turkey
- United Kingdom: Introduced during the 1960s, but was not widely distributed. Was available as late as the autumn of 1995.
- United States
- Vietnam: Locally produced (at Factory Z125) as M79-VN, with plum-red synthetic stock and optical sight. Industrial name is SPL40.
- Yemen

=== Non-state users ===
- Lord's Resistance Army
- Moro Islamic Liberation Front
- Viet Cong

== See also ==
- B&T GL-06 Grenade Launcher
- China Lake Grenade Launcher
- EAGLE grenade launcher
- FN40GL EGLM
- Fort-600 Grenade Launcher
- HK69 Grenade Launcher
- HK M320
- Mk 19 grenade launcher
- XM174 grenade launcher
- Pike (munition)

== Bibliography ==
- Pitta, Robert (27 May 1993). South African Special Forces. Osprey Publishing. ISBN 1855322943.
