= M576 40 mm grenade =

Type of grenade

The M576 is a US Army designation for a 2.646 in (67.2 mm) long and 0.254 lb (0.12 kg) heavy US 40mm grenade buckshot load used in the M79, M203, M320, and M32 MGL grenade launchers. It is olive drab with black markings. It was designed to give the soldier carrying a grenade launcher a powerful cartridge for close quarters combat with the maximum range at 98 ft (30 m) such as found in clearing buildings, bunkers, and trenches, as well as thick vegetation at 885 ft/s (269 m/s).

When the 40mm M79 grenade launcher was first developed, the weapon was to be the primary weapon of the infantryman carrying it. It was quickly found that in most engagements, while the grenadier gave the squad a decided force multiplier, the grenadiers themselves were exposed if presented with an enemy closer than the arming distance of high explosive rounds. Even rounds with a shorter arming distance presented significant danger to the shooter if used at those ranges. Development commenced on non-explosive cartridges to allow those armed with grenade launchers to engage targets at shorter ranges safely.

The M576 contains twenty metal pellets with an overall weight of 24 grams. The XM576/XM576E1 was standardized to become the M576. Normal dispersion pattern of the M576 will put 13 of 20 pellets in a 1.5 meter circle at 40 meters. The remaining 7 pellets could land anywhere. Another test variant, the XM576E2, which had twenty seven metal pellets without a sabot within the shot cup, was deemed to spread too quickly for effective use. Both types had a muzzle velocity of roughly 880 ft/s (268 m/s).
