= T148E1 grenade launcher =

T148E1
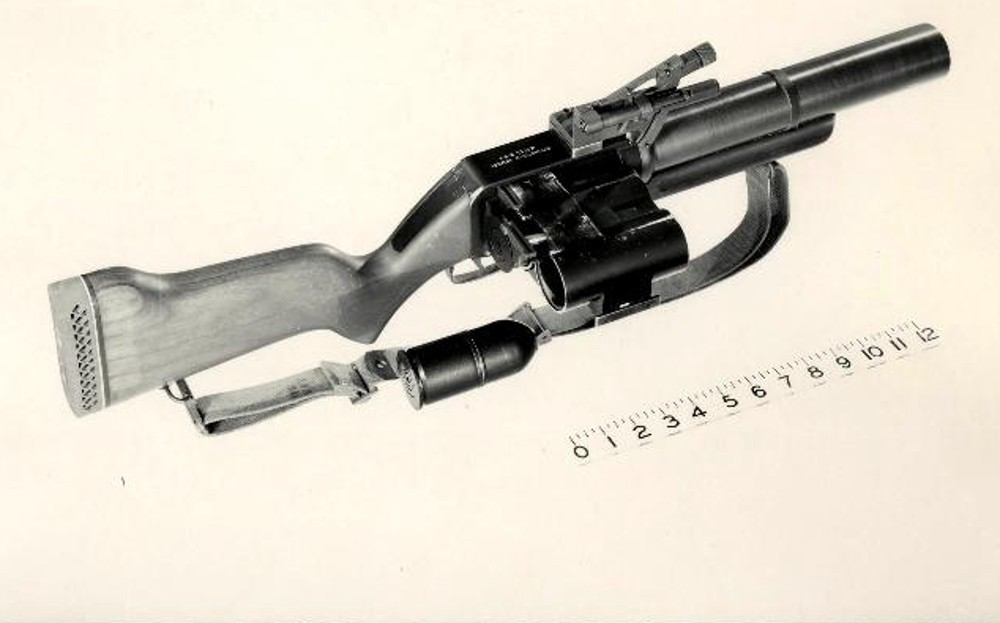
- Type: Grenade launcher
- Place of origin: United States

Production history
- Designer: Springfield Armory
- Designed: 1957–1960

Specifications
- Length: 29.5 inches (74.9 cm)
- Cartridge: 40mm High Explosive, 3 round magazine
- Action: Semi-automatic percussion
- Sights: Adjustable iron sight

The T148E1 Grenade Launcher is an American semi-automatic grenade launcher manufactured by Springfield Armory, being the first in the T148 (sometimes written "T-148") launcher family. It fires 40mm grenades from a three-round magazine in a harmonica gun type configuration.

The weapon was tested during the early part of the Vietnam War, though never officially used in combat. The already deployed Springfield Armory M79 which the design was based on was relatively new for grenadiers, although the M79 left a pause of "out of combat" to its operators due to the need to reload after each firing, which could endanger the user briefly during a firefight situation. The T148E1 was designed experimentally in an attempt to create a launcher that would solve this issue.

With few produced and the design program prematurely ending the manufacturing by termination of the project(s) in 1960, the weapon was ultimately rejected for adoption due to being prone to jamming, a result of the vulnerability to dirt and poor conditions with its chambering method, which deemed it unreliable.

Currently, at least four of the launchers are on record of being in the Springfield Armory Museum's collection in Springfield, Massachusetts; and at least one at the Royal Armouries Museum in Leeds, West Yorkshire.
