= M203 grenade launcher =

Launcher, Grenade, 40mm, M203
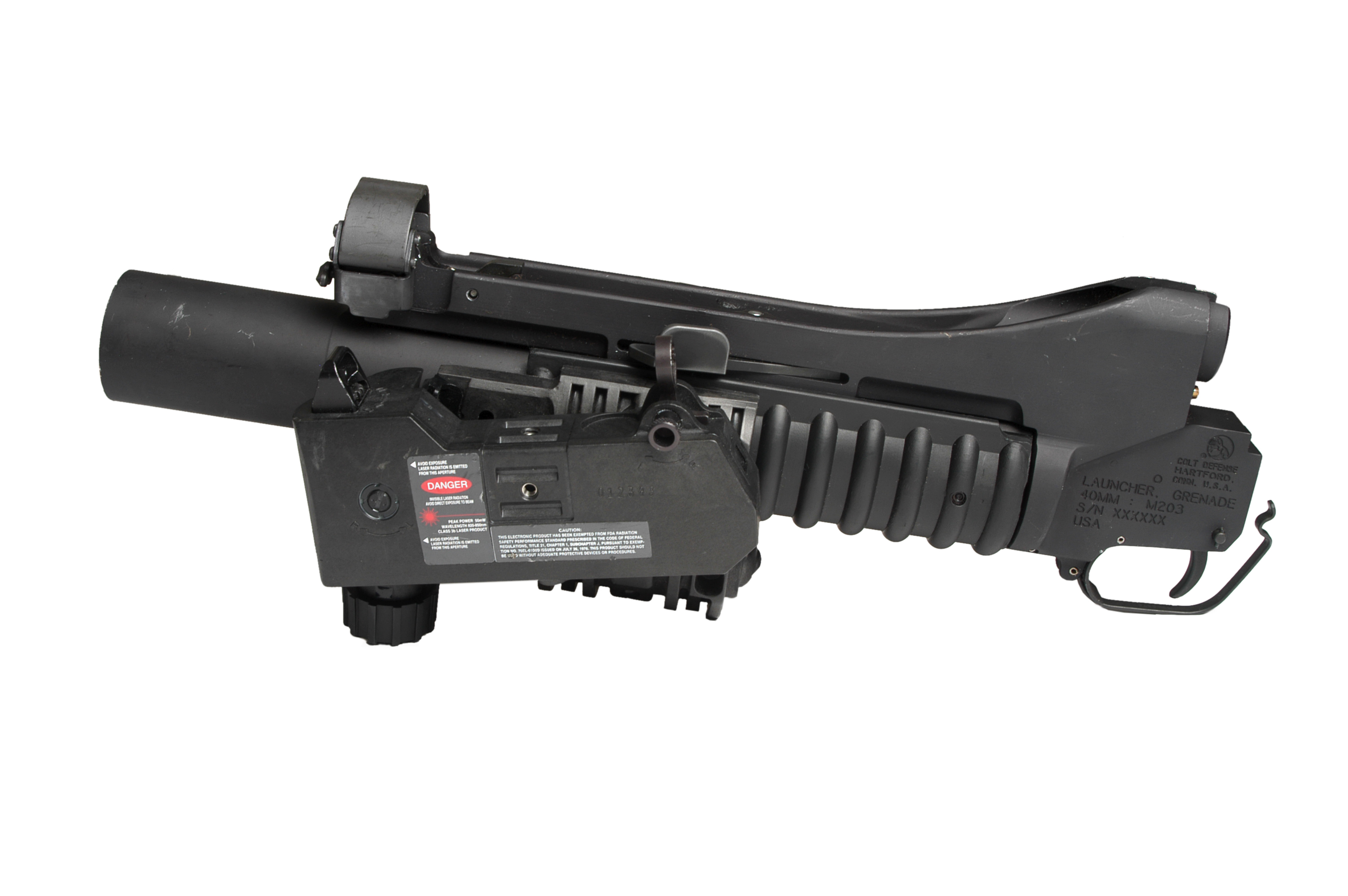
- M203A2
- Type: Grenade launcher
- Place of origin: United States

Service history
- In service: 1969–present
- Used by: See Users
- Wars: Vietnam War; Laotian Civil War; Cambodian Civil War; Civil conflict in the Philippines; Sino-Vietnamese War; Cambodian–Vietnamese War; Sino-Vietnamese conflicts (1979–1991); Third Indochina War; Soviet–Afghan War; Falklands War; Gulf War; War in Afghanistan (2001–2021); Iraq War; War in Iraq (2013–2017); Syrian Civil War; Gaza war Russian invasion of Ukraine; 2025 Cambodia-Thailand conflict

Production history
- Designer: AAI
- Designed: 1967–68
- Manufacturer: Colt Defense; Diemaco; Airtronic USA; RM Equipment; U.S. Ordnance; Knight's Armament Company; Lewis Machine & Tool Company
- Unit cost: US$1,082
- Produced: 1969–present
- Variants: See Variants

Specifications
- Mass: 3 lb (1.36 kg) (unloaded)
- Length: M203/M203A2: 15 in (380 mm); M203A1: 12 in (305 mm)
- Barrel length: M203/M203A2: 12 in (305 mm); M203A1: 9 in (230 mm)
- Cartridge: 40×46mm SR
- Action: Single shot
- Rate of fire: 5 to 7 round/min aimed shots 15 to 17 round/min area suppression
- Muzzle velocity: 250 ft/s (76 m/s)
- Effective firing range: 382 yds (350 m) fire-team sized area target; 164 yds (150 m) vehicle or weapon point target
- Maximum firing range: 437 yds (400 m)
- Sights: Quadrant sight or ladder sight on rifle Video of M203 grenade launcher with indirect fire sight (IFS) being fired (0:39)

The M203 is a single-shot, pump action, 40 mm under-barrel grenade launcher designed to attach to a rifle. It uses the same rounds as the older stand-alone M79 break-action grenade launcher, which utilizes the high-low propulsion system to keep recoil forces low. While compatible with many weapons, the M203 was originally designed and produced by the United States military for the M16 rifle and its carbine variant, the M4. The launcher can also be mounted onto a C7, a Canadian version of the M16 rifle; this requires the prior removal of the bottom handguard.

Stand-alone variants of the M203 exist, as do versions designed specifically for many other rifles. The device attaches under the barrel, the launcher trigger being in the rear of the launcher, just forward of the rifle magazine. The rifle magazine functions as a hand grip when firing the M203. A separate, right-handed only, sighting system is added to rifles fitted with the M203, as the rifle's standard sights are not matched to the launcher. The version fitted to the Canadian C7 has a sight attached to the side of the launcher, either on the left or right depending on the user's needs.

== History ==
The M203 was the only part of the United States Army's Special Purpose Individual Weapon (SPIW) project to go into production. The M203 has been in service since 1969 and was introduced to US military forces during the early 1970s, replacing the M79 grenade launcher and the conceptually similar Colt XM148 design. However, while the M79 was a stand-alone weapon (and usually the primary weapon of troops who carried it), the M203 was designed as an under-barrel device attached to an existing rifle. Because the size and weight of 40 mm ammunition limits the quantities that can be carried, and because a grenade is often not an appropriate weapon for all engagements (such as when the target is at close range or near friendly troops), an under-barrel system has the advantage of allowing its user to also carry a rifle, and to easily switch between the two.

A new grenade launcher, the M320, will eventually replace the M203 in the United States Army. The United States Marine Corps, Air Force, Coast Guard, and Navy continued to use the older M203, although the Marines began issuing the M320 in June 2017. The M320 features an advanced day/night sight, a double-action firing mechanism (as opposed to the M203's single-action) as well as other benefits, such as an unobstructed side-loading breech.

== Uses ==
The M203 grenade launcher is intended to be used as close fire support against point and area targets. The round is designed to be effective at breaking through windows and exploding inside, blowing up doors, producing multiple casualties, destroying bunkers or emplacements, and damaging or disabling soft-skinned vehicles. In the Vietnam War, U.S. Navy and Coast Guard personnel on boats would lob 40 mm grenades into the water (using the M79 grenade launcher), to preemptively attack Viet Cong swimmers ("sappers") attempting to plant explosives on anchored or moored U.S. watercraft.

Its primary purpose is to engage enemies in dead space that cannot be reached by direct fire. A well-trained M203 gunner can use their weapon to suppress the enemy, based on movement and sight. In addition, the M203 can be used as a crowd control weapon when equipped with the M651 tactical CS (tear gas) grenade. While classified primarily as an anti-personnel weapon, the shaped charge featured in the HEDP round gives it the capability to penetrate lightly armored vehicles.

== Rounds ==
The M203 is able to fire a variety of different rounds for many purposes. According to the U.S. Army Field Manual FM 3-22.31 40-MM Grenade Launcher, M203, there are eight different rounds for the M203:

40 mm ammunition line drawings

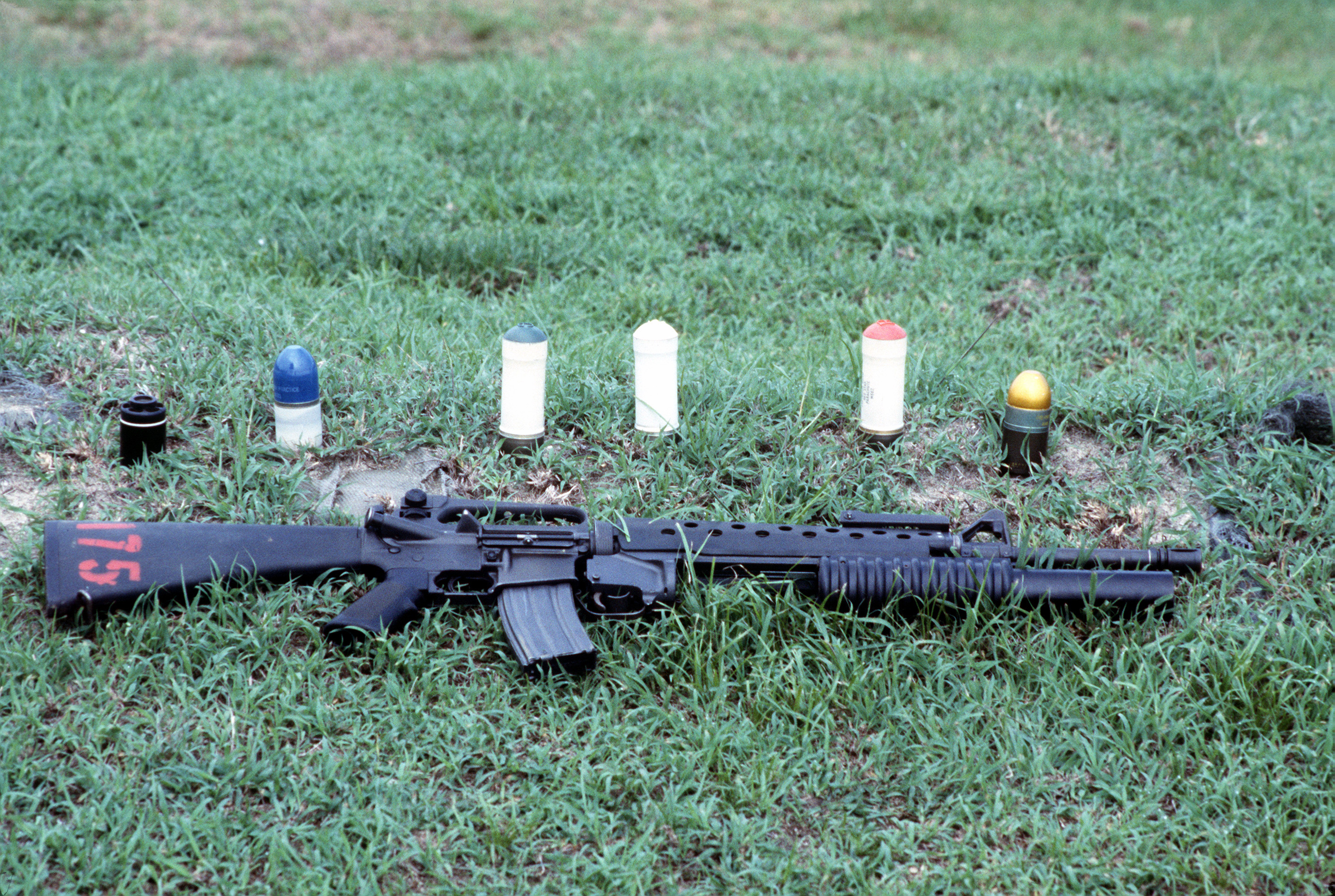
An M16A2 rifle equipped with an M203 grenade launcher lies in the grass near some of the types of 40 mm ammunition available for use with the M203. The cartridges are, from left to right, multiple projectile, practice, green star flare, white star flare, red star flare and high explosive dual purpose.

- (M433) high-explosive dual purpose round. The HEDP round has an olive drab aluminum skirt with a steel cup attached, white markings, and a gold ogive (head of the round). It penetrates at least 5 cm (2 inches) when fired straight at steel armor at 150 m (490 ft) or less, or, at a point target, it arms between 14 and 27 m (46 and 89 ft), causes casualties within a 130 m (430 ft) radius, and has a kill radius of 5 meters.
- (M406) high-explosive round. The HE round has an olive drab aluminum skirt with a steel projectile attached, gold markings, and a yellow ogive. It arms between 14 and 27 m (46 and 89 ft), produces a ground burst that causes casualties within a 130 m (430 ft) radius, and has a kill radius of 5 m (16 ft).
- (M583A1) star parachute round. This round is white impact or bar alloy aluminum, with black markings. It is used for illumination and signals and is lighter and more accurate than comparable handheld signal rounds. The parachute attached to the round deploys upon ejection to lower the candle at 7 ft/s (2.1 m/s). The candle burns for about 40 seconds. A raised letter on the top of the round denotes the color of the parachute.
- (M585) white star cluster round. This round is white impact or bar aluminum alloy, with black markings. The attached plastic ogive has five raised dots for night identification. The round is used for illumination or signals. It is lighter and more accurate than comparable handheld signal rounds. The individual stars burn for about 7 seconds during free fall.
- (M713) ground marker round. This round is light green impact aluminum with black markings. It is used for aerial identification and for marking the location of soldiers on the ground. It arms between 15 and 45 m (49 and 148 ft). If a fuse fails to function on impact, the output mixture provided in the front end of the delay casing backs up the impact feature. The color of the ogive indicates the color of the smoke.
- (M781) practice round. Used for practice, this round is blue zinc or aluminum, with white markings. It produces a yellow or orange signature on impact, arms between 14 and 27 m (46 and 89 ft), and has a danger radius of 20 m (66 ft).
- (M651) CS round. This round is gray aluminum with a green casing and black markings. Though it is a multipurpose round, it is most effective for riot control and in Urban Operations. It arms between 10 and 30 m (33 and 98 ft) and produces a white cloud of CS gas on impact.
- (M576) buckshot round. This round is olive drab with black markings. Though it is a multipurpose round, it is most effective in thick vegetated areas or for room clearing. Inside, it has 20 metal pellets, each weighing 24 gr (1.6 g), with a muzzle velocity of 269 m/s (880 ft/s). The round has no mechanical-type fuse.

== Components ==
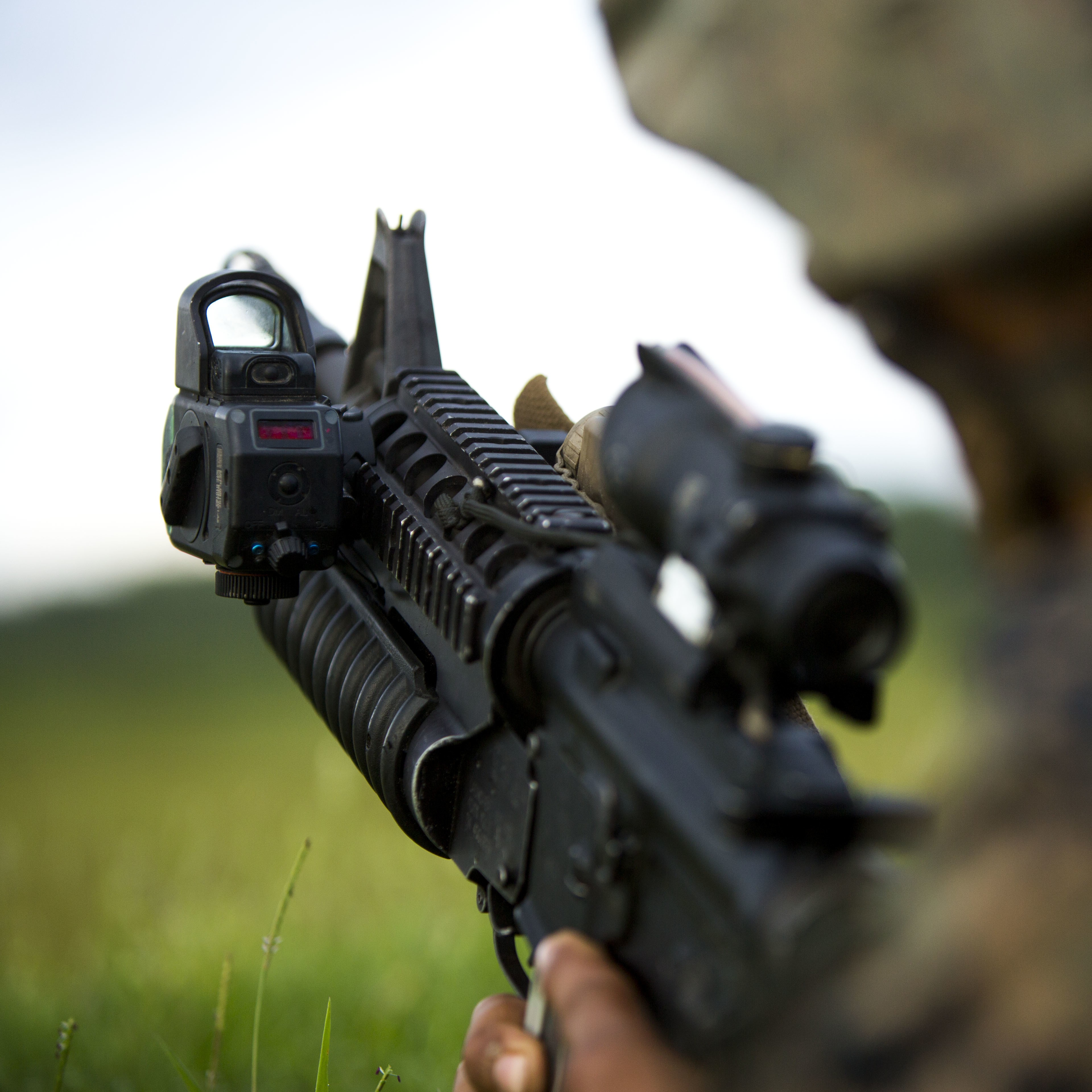
M203 with SU-277/PSQ GLS

The M203 grenade launcher system comes with a variety of components, usually including the launcher, adapters for attachment to assault rifles, and leaf sights (which can be used with the rifle's front sight post). M203s can also come with quadrant sights, mounting to an MIL-STD 1913 Rail, or to the carrying handle of an M16 rifle.

The U.S. Marine Corps also uses the SU-277/PSQ Grenade Launcher Sight (GLS), which features a holographic red dot for improved aiming, integrated ballistic data for automatic adjustment based on ammunition, infrared aiming laser, and a compact, lightweight design.

== Variants ==
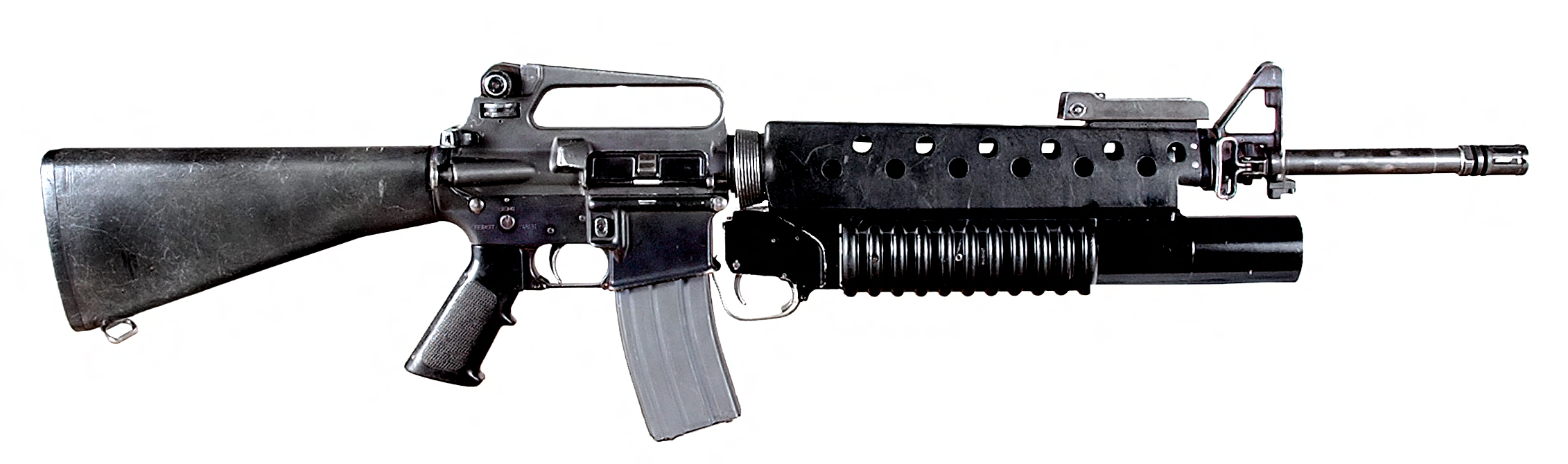
M16A2 with an M203

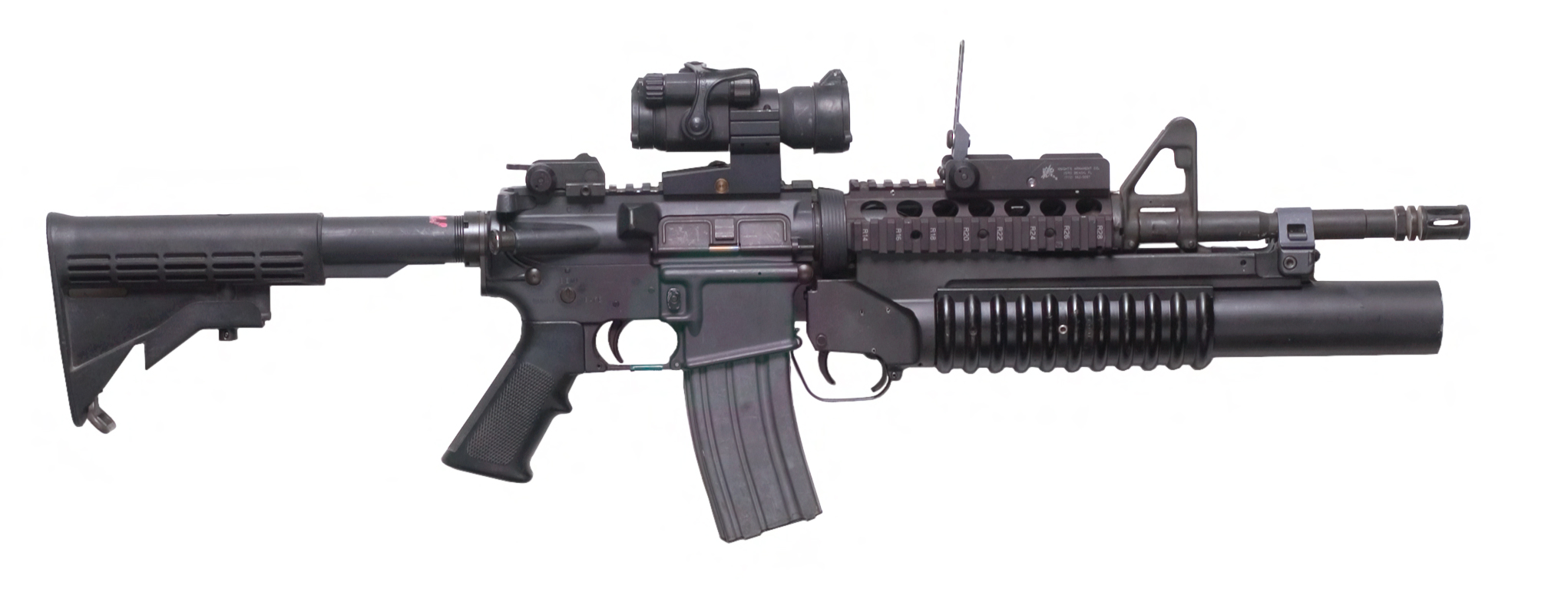
M4A1 with an M203A2

There are numerous variants of the M203 manufactured in the U.S., and throughout the world, for various applications. These vary chiefly in the length of the barrel, attachment type, and quick detach (QD) capability.

The standard M203 is intended for permanent attachment to the M16A1, M16A2 and M16A3 rifles, and utilizes a 12 in (30 cm) rifled barrel. The M203 unmodified to an A1/A2 series will not fit on the M4 carbine series.

The U.S. M203A1 has a barrel of 12 inches, while the SOPMOD M203A1 has a 9 in (23 cm) barrel. The M203A1 is intended for use with the M4 and M4A1 carbines, and uses a special bracket mount consisting of three screws and lacing wire. Only M203A2s consist of a quick release bracket.

The Canadian M203A1 by Diemaco (now Colt Canada) is a similar design with a different mounting system that does not require mounting points of the same profile as the M16A1 rifle's. The weapon's 9 in (23 cm) barrel slides further forward than the standard American models, which allows longer rounds to be loaded. This model is identifiable by the increased distance between the grenade launcher's barrel axis and the rifle's.

The M203A2 is intended for use with the M4 series/M16A4 and now also authorized on the M16A2 rifle as the modular weapon system (MWS). Using standard 12 in (30 cm) barrels, the grenade launcher is intended for use in concert with the Knight's Armament Company M5 RAS. The M5 MWS rail system became authorized in December 2008 for the M16A2 Rifle. An advantage of this system is the use of range-finding optics to make precise targeting easier.

The M203PI system is used for attachment of the M203 to other rifles, including, but not limited to, the Steyr AUG, Heckler & Koch G3, and the MP5 sub-machine gun. Most of these other companies have since devised 40 mm grenade launchers custom integrated with the weapon.

The M203 DAX has a double-action trigger and longer breech opening to accommodate less-lethal rounds.

The M203 and M203A1 are currently manufactured by AIRTRONIC USA, Inc. of Elk Grove Village, Illinois for the U.S. Department of Defense under contract numbers W52H09-06-D-0200 and W52H09-06-D-0225. Each contract is for up to 12,000 units. Each unit is shipped with a hand guard, leaf sight and quadrant range sight. The contracts unit prices vary from $840 to $1,050 each. The production rate is 1,500 units per month. The M203PI is manufactured for both the U.S. Department of Defense and for commercial sales to law enforcement agencies both in the United States and abroad, and for foreign military sales by RM-Equipment Inc. of Miami, Florida.

The M203 37 mm version became available on the U.S. market in 2017. It is available in a 9 in (23 cm) and a 12 in (30 cm) barrel version. They are scroll marked: "Launcher, Grenade M203 40mm", even though they are actually 37 mm devices. These 37 mm versions are considered a "title 1 firearm", and are not classified as "destructive devices" under the NFA. These launchers can be sold the same as regular firearms on an ATF Form 4473.

== Users ==
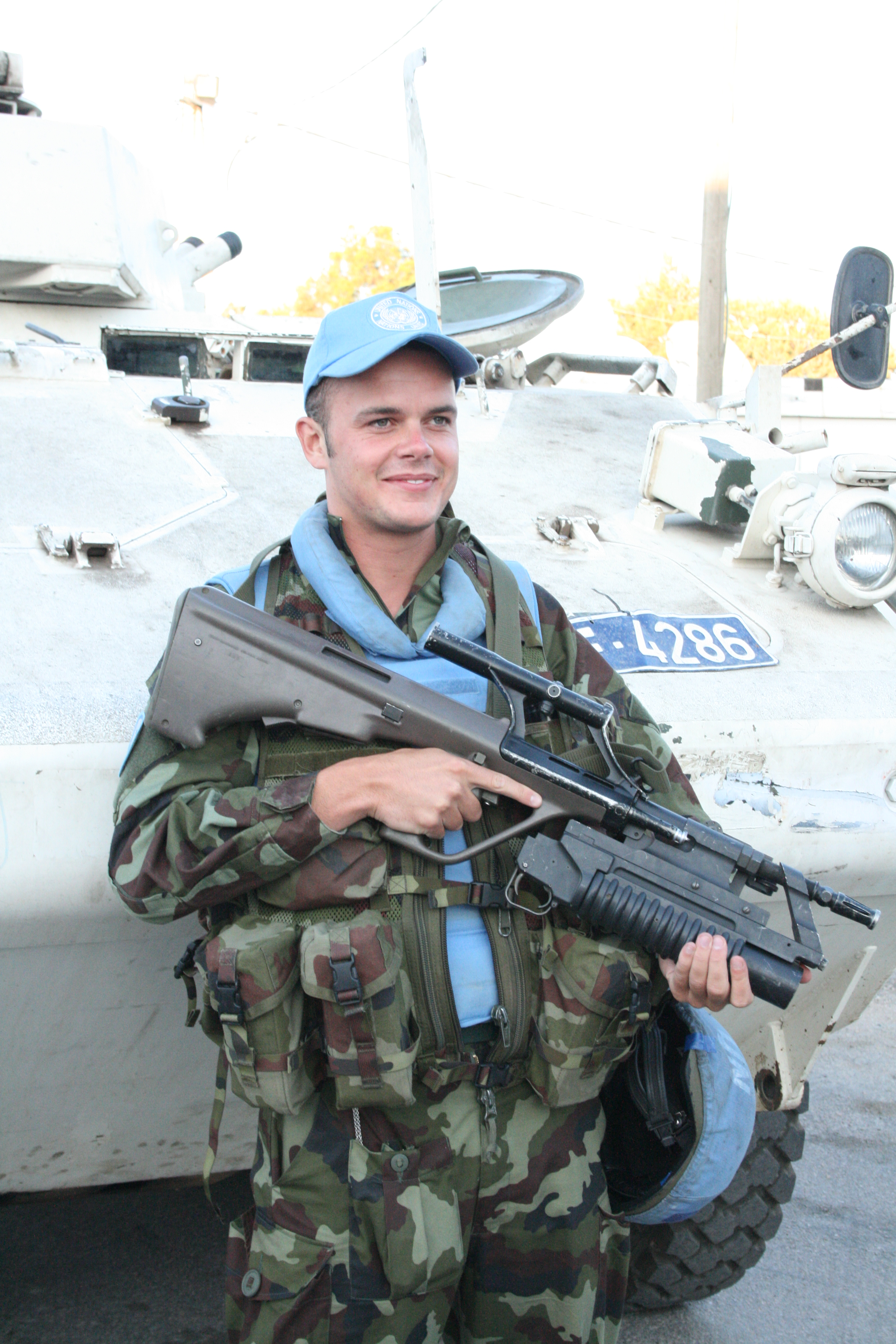
Irish soldier with a Steyr AUG with a short-barreled M203 grenade launcher

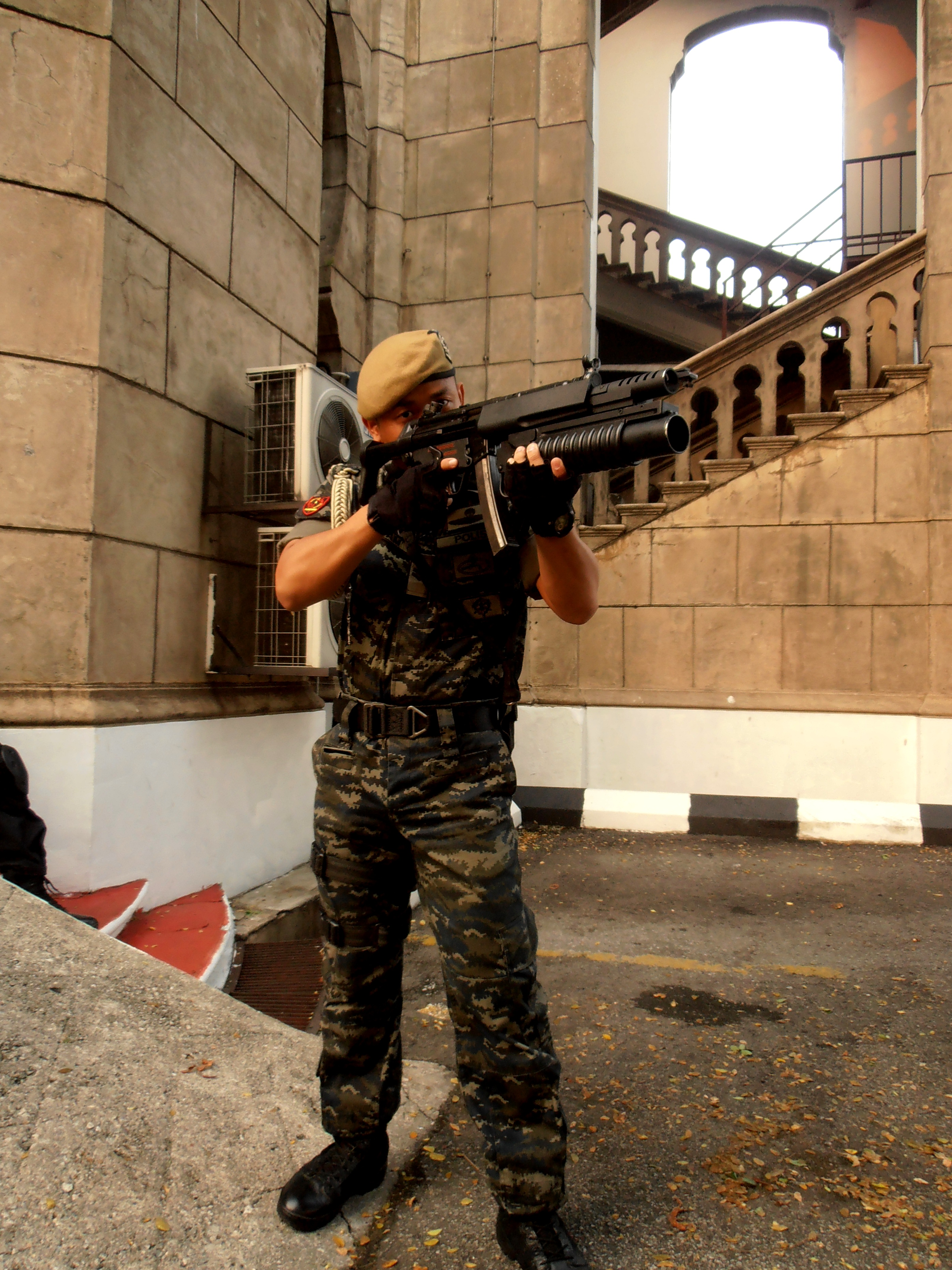
Malaysian Pasukan Gerakan Khas member with a Heckler & Koch MP5 with the RM Equipment M203PI grenade launcher

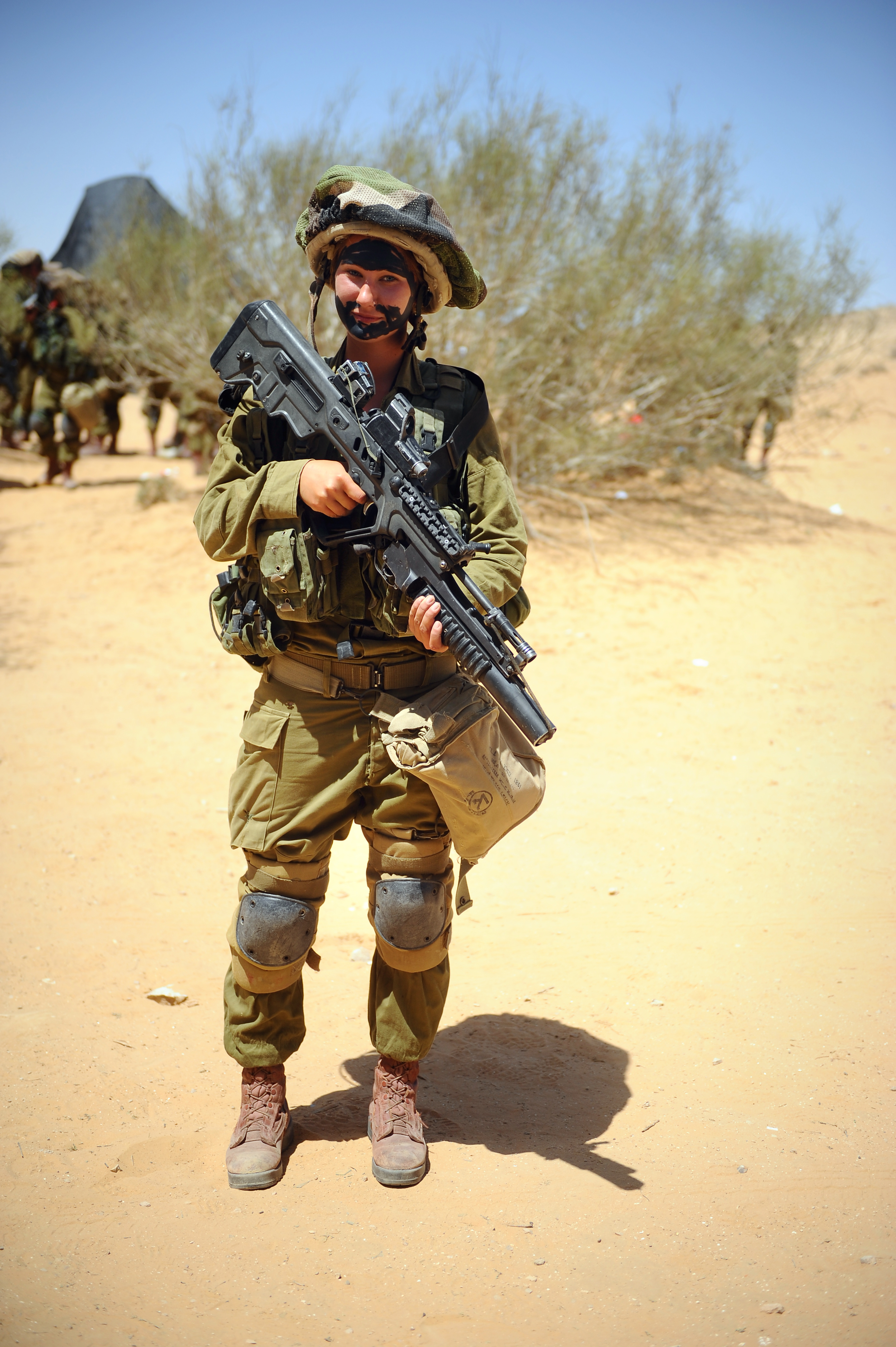
Israeli soldier with an IWI Tavor-21 rifle fitted with M203 grenade launcher

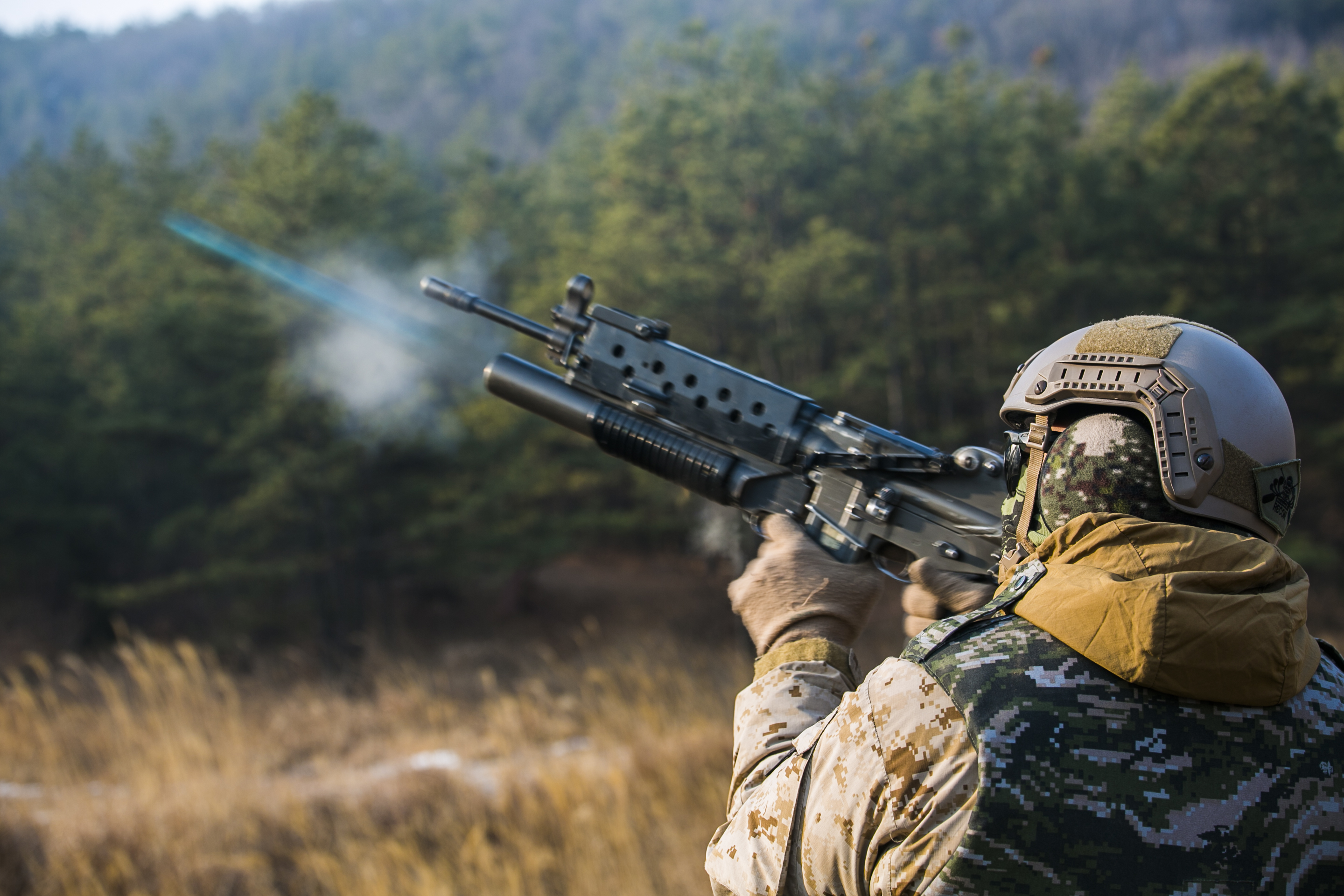
South Korean Daewoo K2 rifle with K201

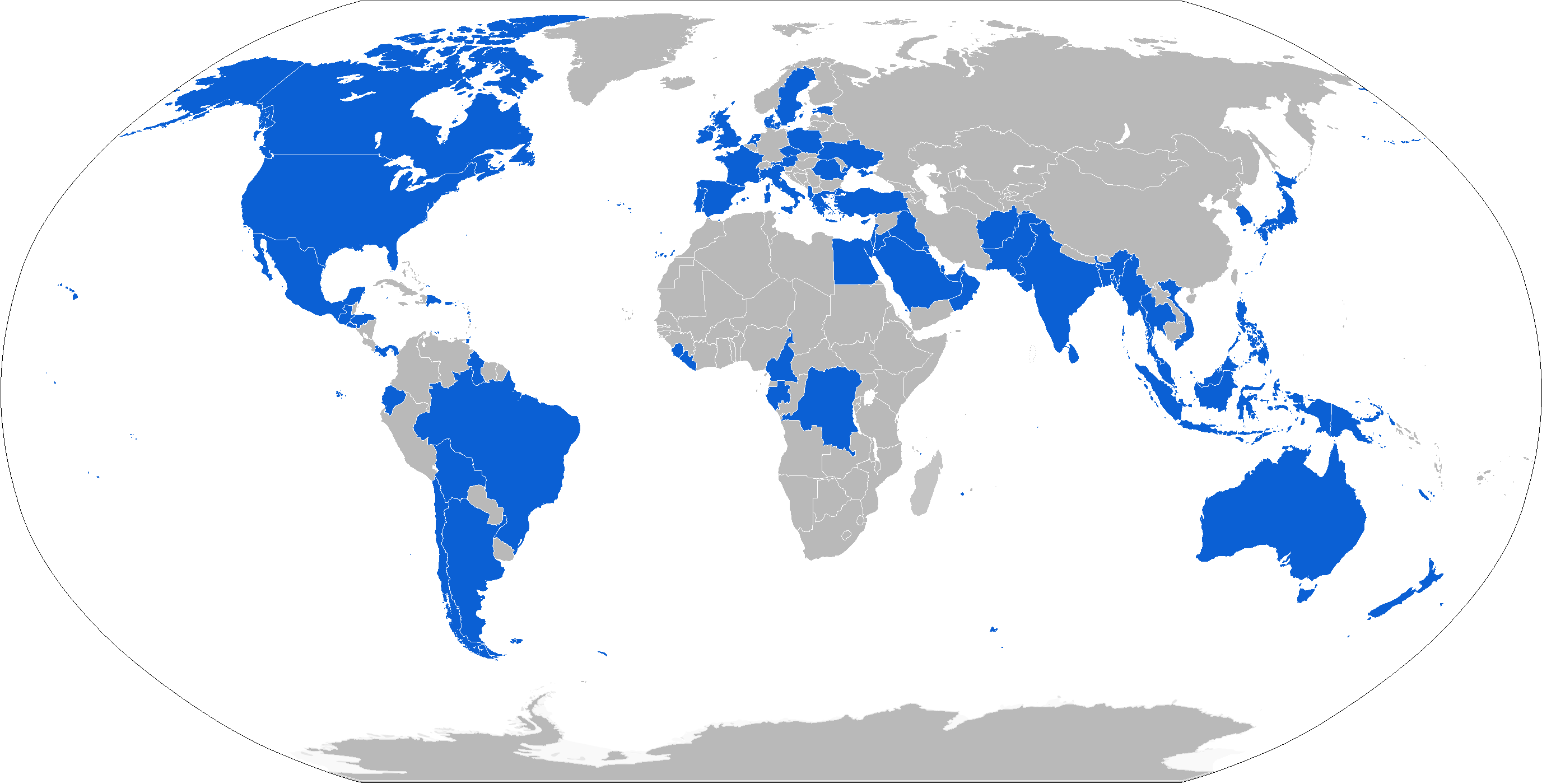
Map with M203 grenade launcher users in blue

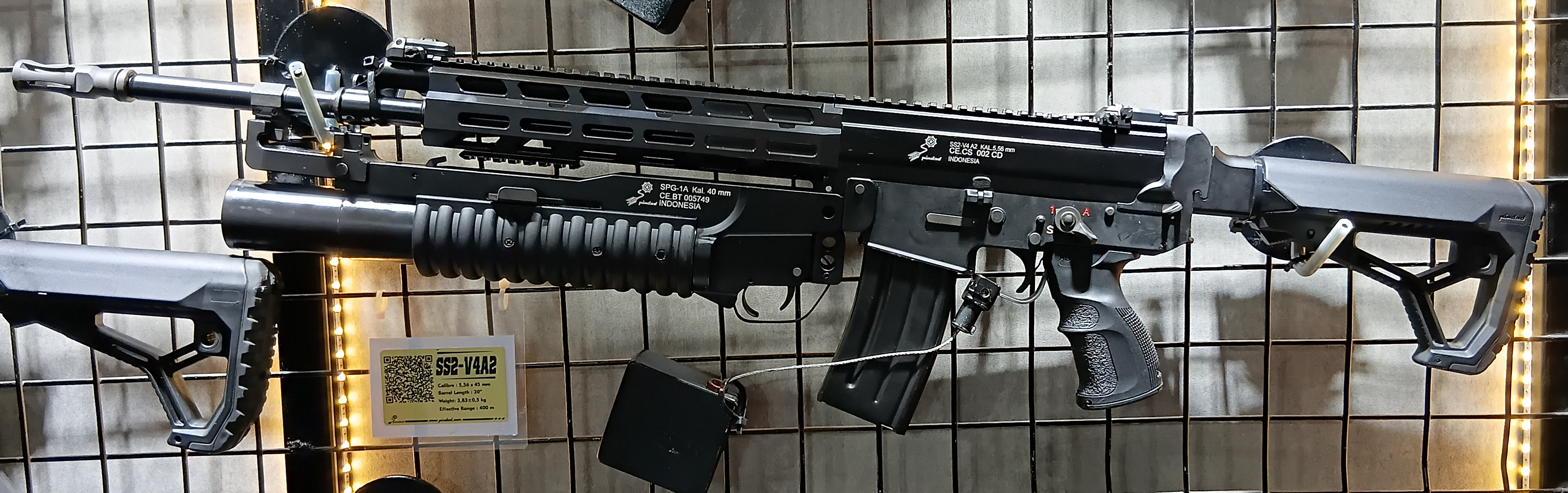
Indonesian Pindad SS2 rifle equipped with SPG-1A

- Afghanistan
- Albania
- Argentina
- Australia: M203PI variant for F88 Austeyr, and M203A1 for M4A1 carbines.
- Austria: M203PI variant.
- Bangladesh
- Bolivia
- Brazil
- Brunei
- Cameroon
- Canada: Canadian Forces: M203A1 variant produced by Colt Canada (formerly Diemaco prior to 2005).
- Chile
- Congo-Kinshasa
- Cyprus: Entered service along Colt M5 in 2024. Used by OYK.
- Czech Republic: Bushmaster M203 used with the Bushmaster M4A3 carbine issued to Czech special forces.
- Denmark
- Dominican Republic
- East Timor
- Ecuador
- Egypt
- El Salvador
- Estonia
- France
- Gabon
- Greece
- Guatemala
- Honduras
- India
- Indonesia: Locally produced by PT Pindad as SPG-1.
- Iraq
- Ireland: Irish Army specialist units, including the Army Ranger Wing (ARW).
- Israel
- Italy
- Japan: Used by the Japan Ground Self-Defense Force.
- Jordan
- Kuwait
- Lebanon
- Liberia
- Malaysia
- Mexico
- Myanmar
- Netherlands
- New Zealand: M203PI variant.
- Oman
- Pakistan: Used by the Pakistan Army.
- Panama
- Papua New Guinea
  - Bougainville: Used by Bougainville Revolutionary Army. Captured from Papua New Guinea Defence Force.
- Philippines Formerly manufactured by Floro International Corporation as the FIC M203.
- Poland: Used by the Polish Special Forces.
- Portugal Used by Special Actions Detachment.
- Qatar
- Romania
- Saudi Arabia
- Sierra Leone
- Singapore
- South Korea: A locally manufactured clone, designated K201, is deployed on the K2 assault rifle.
- Sri Lanka
- Sweden: Designated as Granattillsats 40 mm Ak in the Swedish Armed Forces.
- Thailand
- Turkey: Produced under licence by MKEK as T-40.
- Ukraine
- United Arab Emirates
- United Kingdom: Special Air Service.
- United States
- Vietnam: A local derivative called the OPL-40M.

== Civilian ownership in the United States ==
In the United States, M203 grenade launcher attachments fitted with the standard rifled 40 mm barrels are classified as "destructive devices" under the National Firearms Act (NFA) part 26 U.S.C. 5845, 27 CFR 479.11, because they are a "non-sporting" firearm with a bore greater than one-half inch in diameter. M203s are on the civilian NFA market but are limited as most manufacturers have quit selling to the civilian markets. New M203 launchers sell for approximately $2,000 plus a $200 transfer tax, and new manufacture 40 mm training ammunition is available for $5 to $10 per cartridge, as of March 2011. High explosive 40 mm grenades are available for $400 to $500 per cartridge; however, they are exceedingly rare on the civilian market, as each grenade constitutes a destructive device on its own, and must be registered with the federal government, requiring payment of a $200 tax and compliance with storage regulations for high explosives. There are also sub-caliber adapters available for the 40 mm M203 (and M79) grenade launchers, which will allow the use of standard 12-gauge shotgun shells and .22 rimfire ammo.

In 2017, a 37 mm civilian version became available on the market that is not considered an NFA weapon. As the 37 mm version is not classified as a "destructive device", it can be sold to the general public on the same ATF Form 4473 as most other firearms. The 37 mm launcher can use 37 mm flare rounds already available on the market. This civilian version sells for around $2,000 and accessories such as quick detach mounts and a quadrant sight are also available.

== Data ==
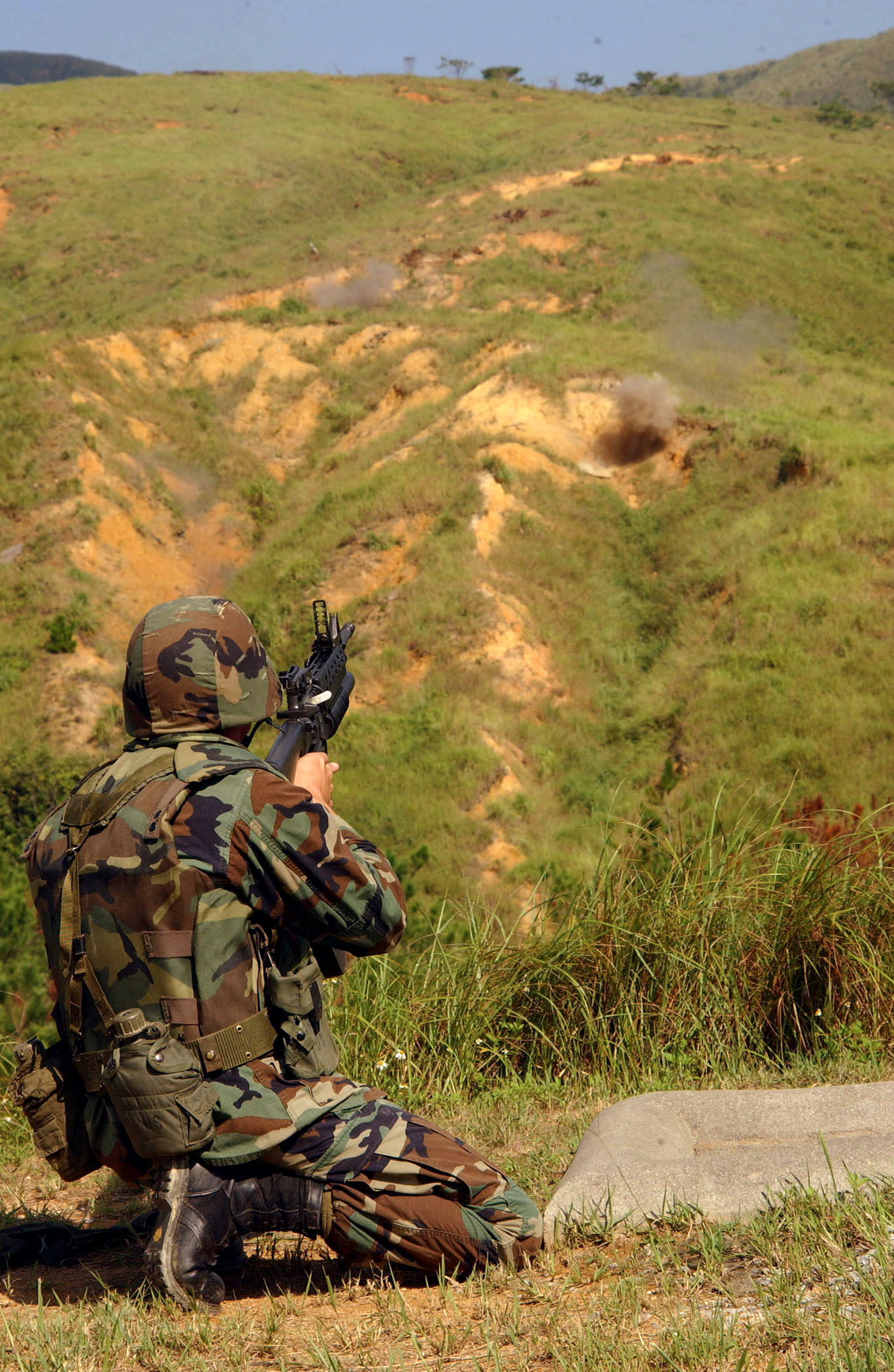
Range qualification with an M203 using the leaf sight

The following technical data for the M203/M203A1 grenade launcher comes directly from the U.S. Army Field Manual FM 3-22.31 40-MM Grenade Launcher, M203.

- Weapon.
  - Length:
    - Rifle and grenade launcher (overall)........................99.0 cm (39 inches)
    - Barrel only................................................................30.5 cm (12 inches)
  - Rifling............................................................................25.4 cm (10 inches)
  - Weight:
    - Launcher, unloaded.................................................1.4 kg (3.0 pounds)
    - Launcher, loaded.....................................................1.6 kg (3.5 pounds)
    - Rifle and grenade launcher, both fully loaded......5.0 kg (11.0 pounds)
  - Number of lands............................................................6 right hand twist
- Ammunition.
  - Caliber............................................................................40 mm
  - Weight.............................................................................About 227 grams (8 ounces)
- Operational characteristics.
  - Action.............................................................................Single shot
  - Sights:
    - Front..........................................................................Leaf sight assembly
    - Rear...........................................................................Quadrant sight
  - Chamber pressure.........................................................206,325 kilopascals (35,000 psi)
  - Muzzle velocity..............................................................76 m/s (250 fps)
  - Maximum range.............................................................About 400 meters (1,312 feet)
    - Maximum effective range:
      - Fire-team sized area target................................350 meters (1,148 feet)
      - Vehicle or weapon point target.........................150 meters (492 feet)
  - Minimum safe firing range (HE):
    - Training.....................................................................130 meters (426 feet)
    - Combat......................................................................31 meters (102 feet)
  - Minimum arming range.................................................About 14 to 38 meters (46 to 125 feet)
  - Rate of fire......................................................................5 to 7 rounds per minute
  - Minimum combat load...................................................36 HE rounds

Note: some data differs for versions that attach to the M4 carbine.

The 40 mm grenades used in the M203 (40 × 46 mm) are not the same as those used by the Mk 19 grenade launcher (40 × 53 mm), which are fired at higher velocities)

== Gallery ==
Diagram of an HEDP.

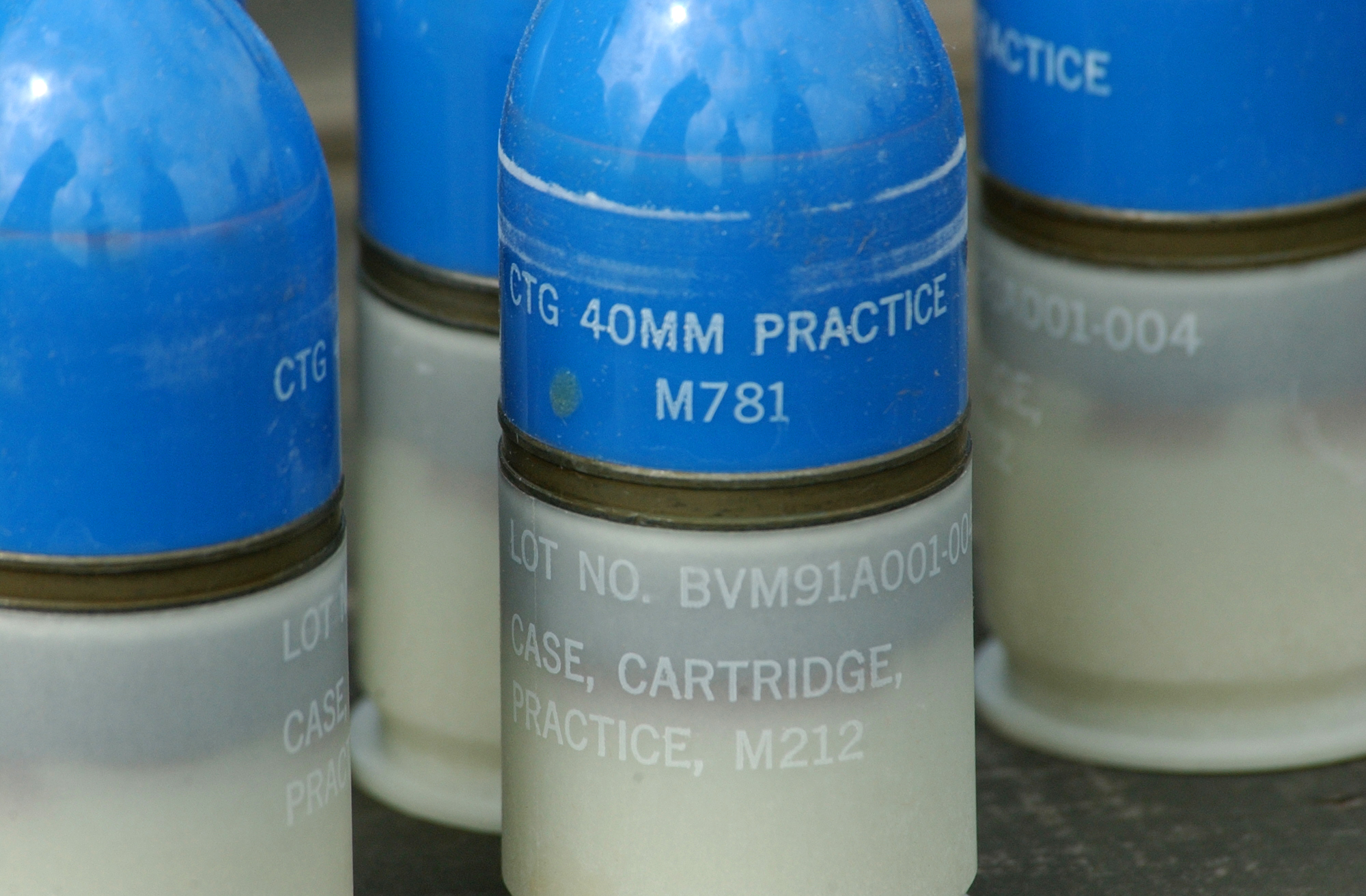
40 mm practice grenades.

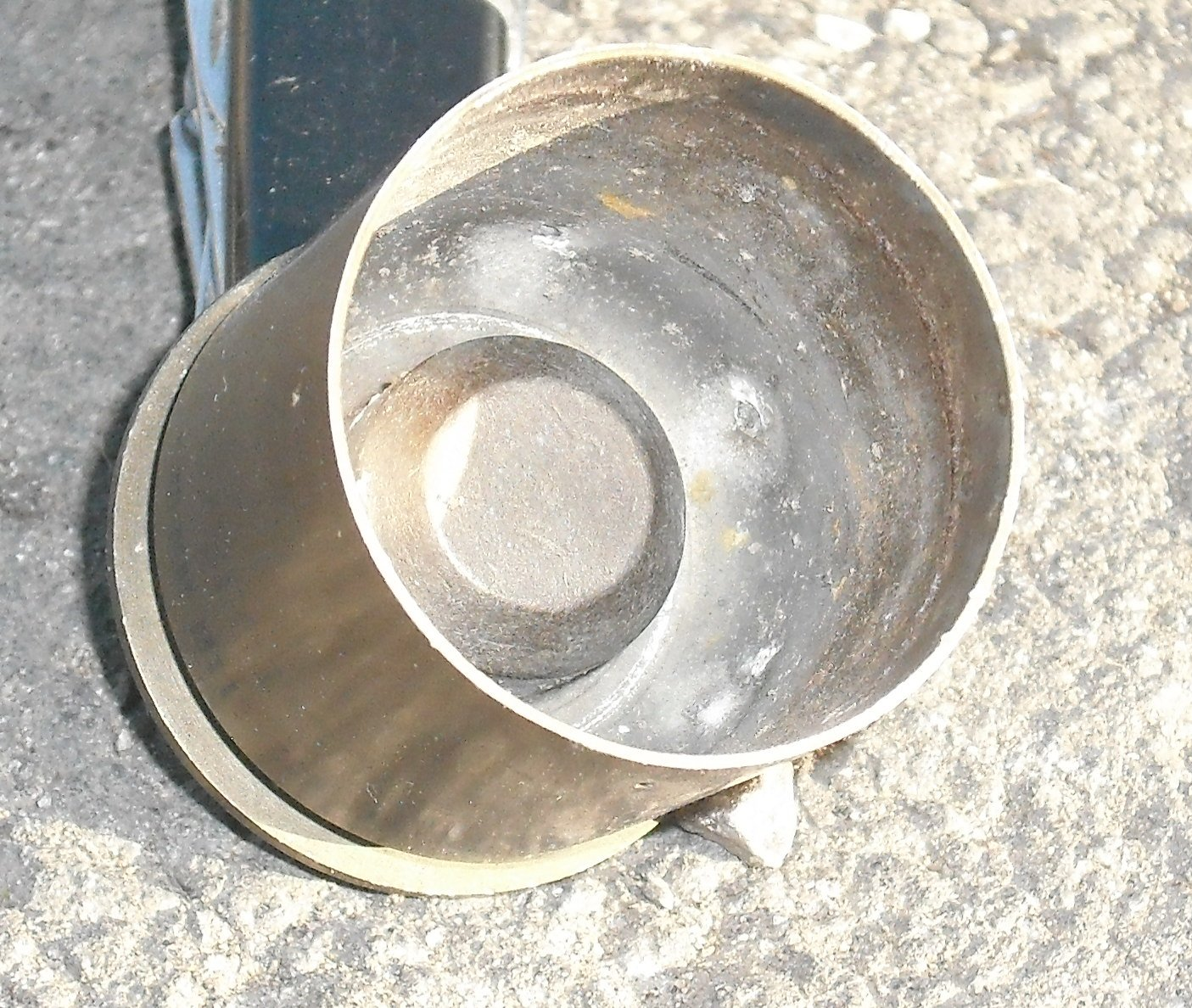
Inside view of a spent casing for a 40 mm grenade, showing the internal pressure chamber for the high-low pressure system.

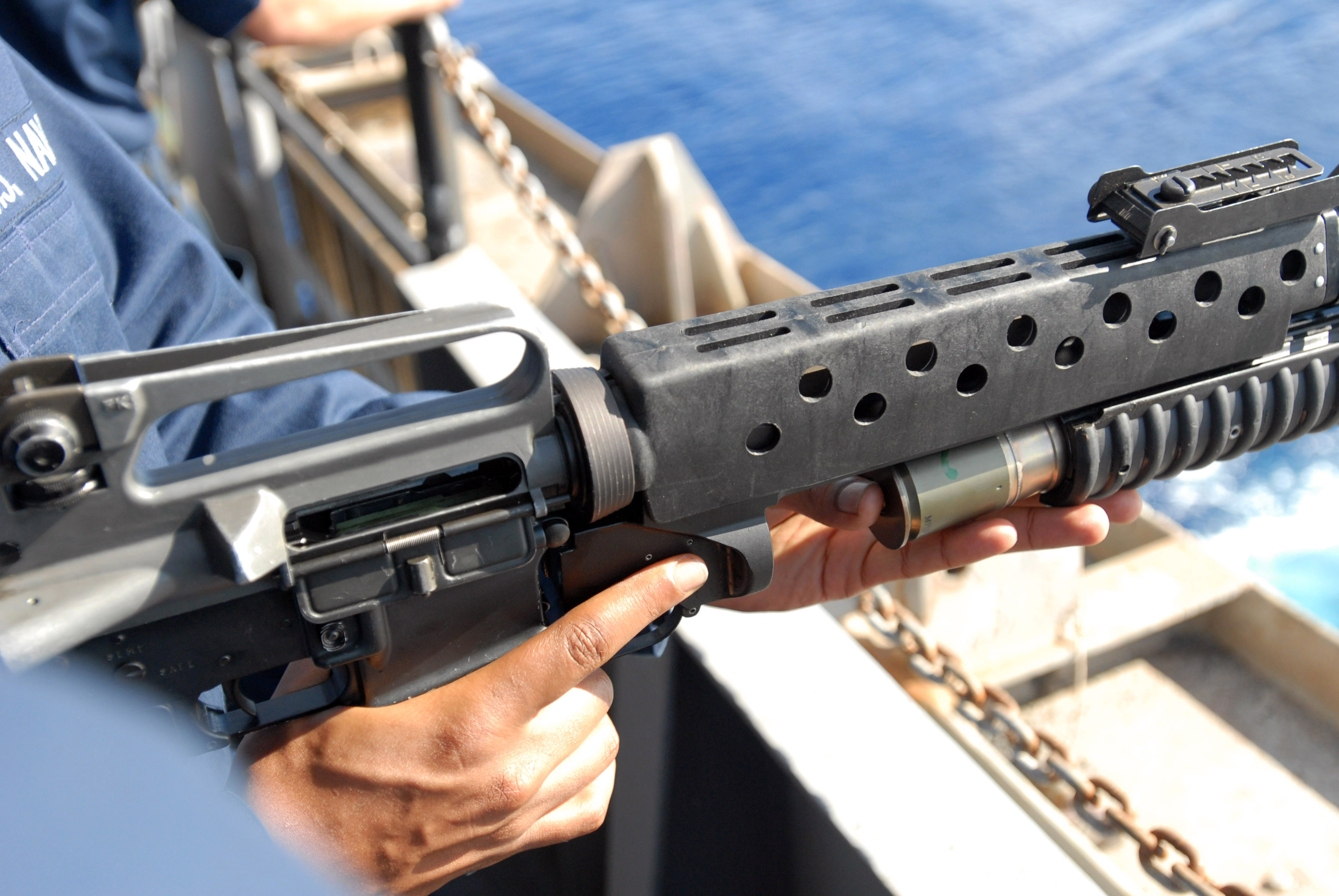
Navy sailor loading an M203 attached to an M16A2 with a high explosive round.

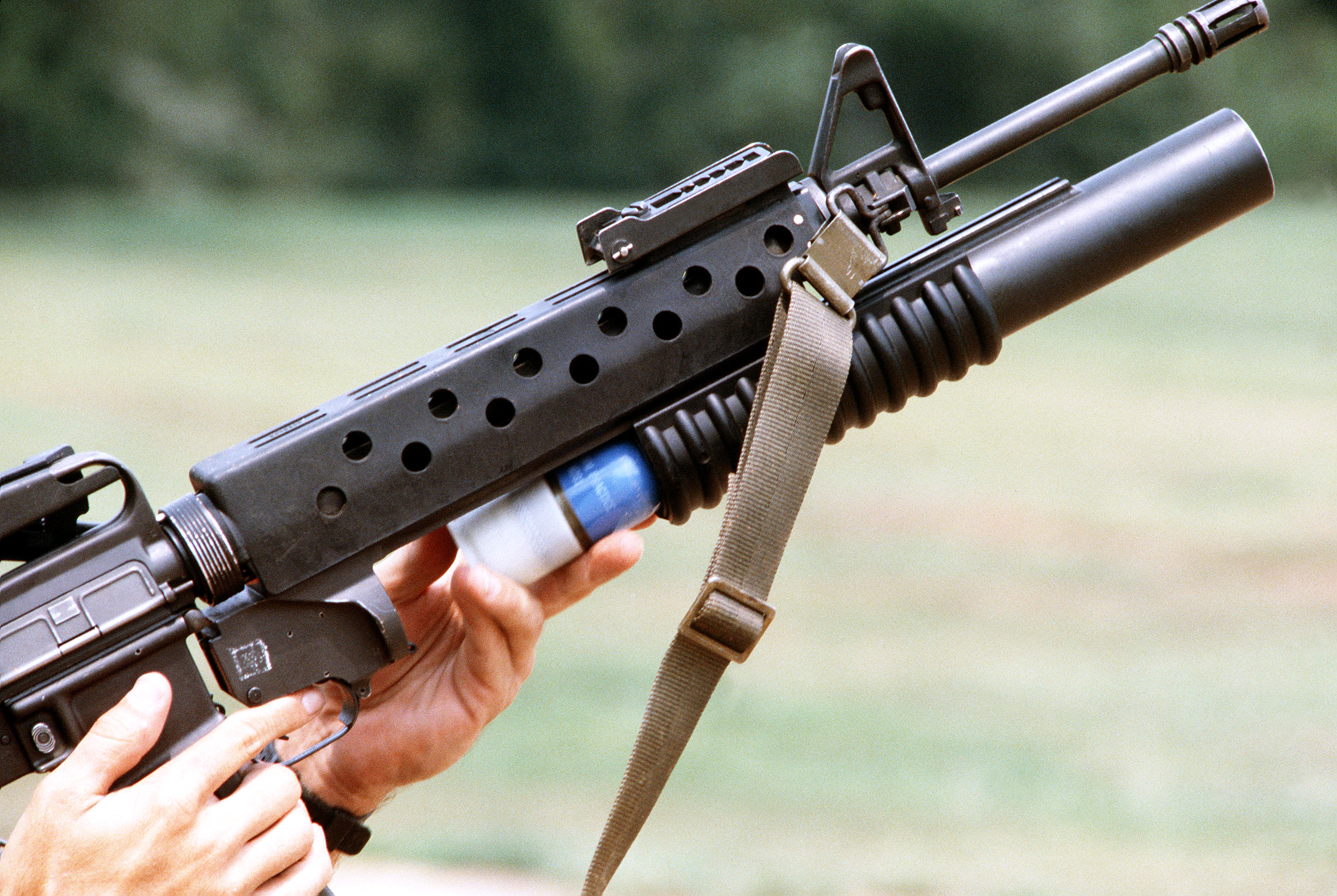
Loading an M203 attached to an M16A1 with a practice round

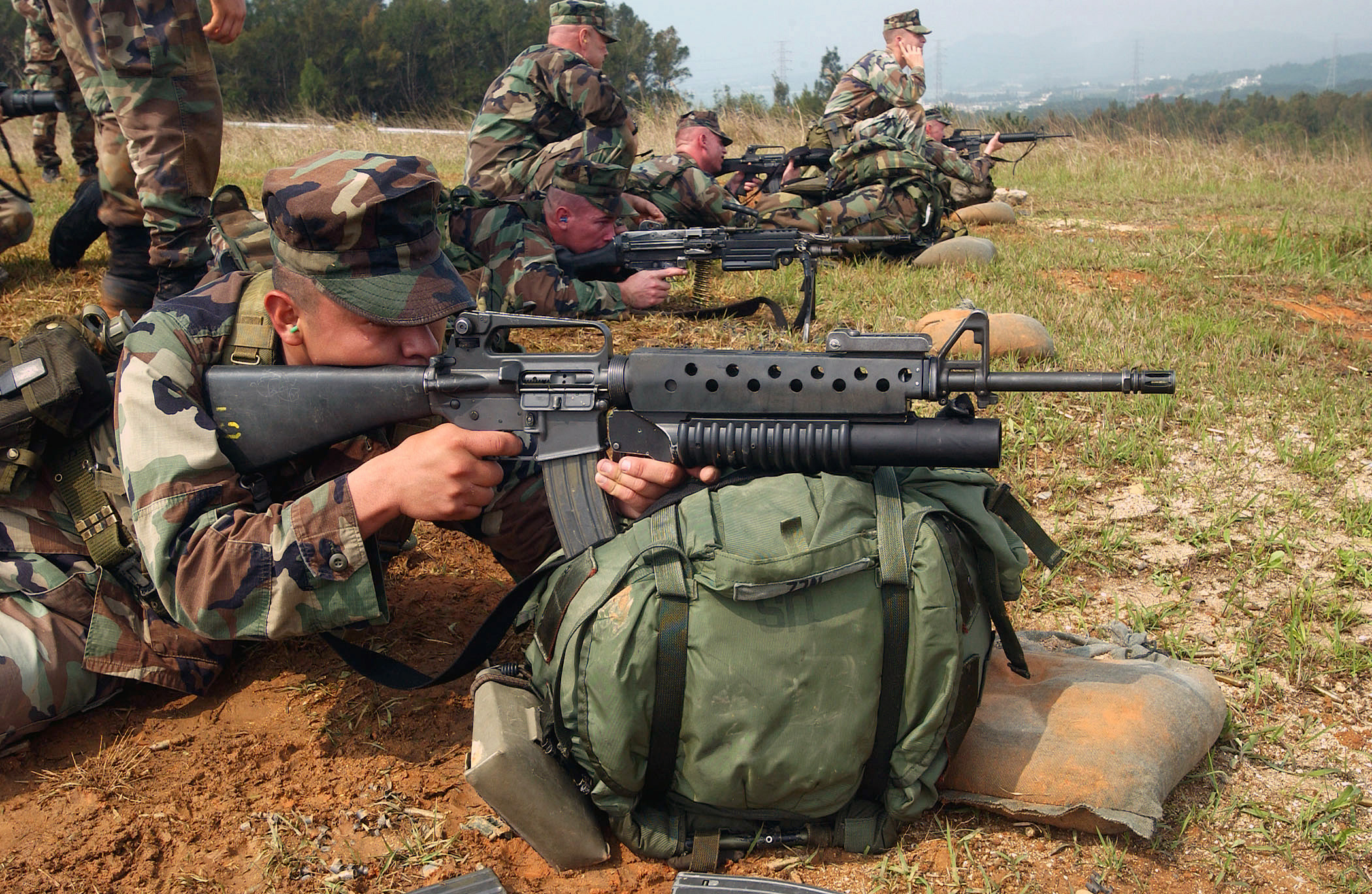
A U.S. Marine takes aim with an M16A2 fitted with the M203 40 mm grenade launcher.

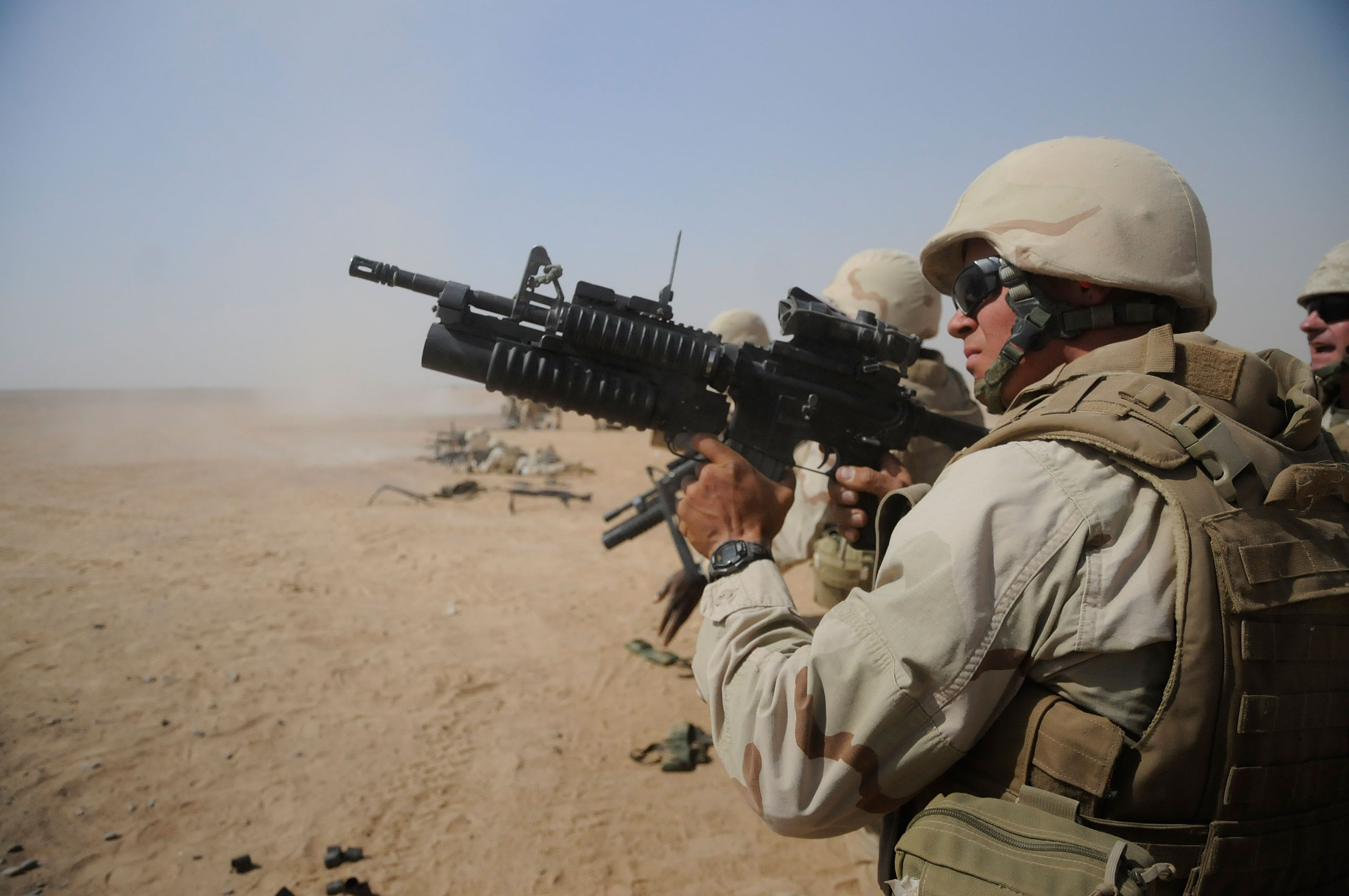
M4 carbine with M203A1 (9 in barrel), US Navy Seabees in Afghanistan 2010.

== See also ==
- Grenadier
- Rifle grenade
- List of individual weapons of the U.S. Armed Forces
- United States 40 mm grenades

Other under-barrel grenade launchers

- AG36 – widely used grenade launcher from Heckler & Koch
- M320 – US Army M203 successor and AG36 derived
- FN40GL – FN Herstal Mk 13 Mod 0 developed for FN SCAR and US SOCOM
- MEI HELLHOUND – 40 mm ammunition development
- GP-25 – 40 mm under-barrel grenade launcher for Kalashnikov series rifles
- Type 91 grenade launcher – 35 mm under-barrel grenade launcher for the Chinese QBZ-95 rifle

Related

- KAC Masterkey – under-barrel shotgun
- M26 Modular Accessory Shotgun System (MASS) – under-barrel shotgun

== Bibliography ==
- Headquarters Department of the Army (13 February 2003). FM 3-22.31 (FM 23-31) 40-MM Grenade Launcher, M203, M203 (PDF) (Report). Washington D.C.: Berlin Information-center for Transatlantic Security.
- Hogg, Ian V. (1994). Jane's Infantry Weapons, 1994-95. Jane's Information Group. ISBN 978-0710611598.
