= XM148 grenade launcher =

Launcher, Grenade, 40 mm, XM148
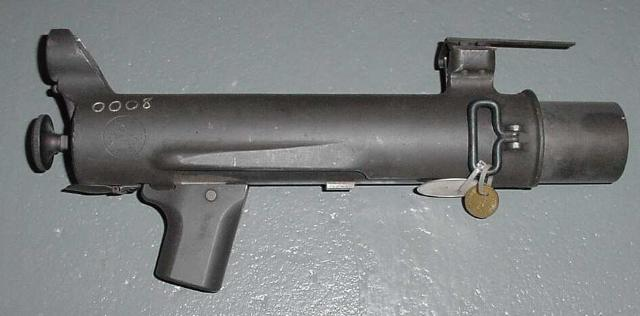
- An XM148 grenade launcher
- Type: Grenade launcher
- Place of origin: United States

Service history
- Used by: See Users
- Wars: Vietnam War; Laotian Civil War; 1989 Philippine coup attempt (USAF issue)

Production history
- Designer: Karl R. Lewis
- Designed: 1964
- Manufacturer: Colt Firearms

Specifications
- Mass: 3 lb (1.36 kg)
- Length: 16.5 in (42 cm)
- Barrel length: 10 in (25 cm)
- Cartridge: 40×46mm grenade
- Action: Single-shot
- Muzzle velocity: 247 ft/s (74.5 m/s)
- Maximum firing range: 437 yd (400 m)
- Sights: Quadrant sight

The XM148 was an experimental 40 mm grenade launcher developed by Colt Firearms as the CGL-4 (Colt Grenade Launcher). Colt manufactured the launcher for field testing during the Vietnam War era. After problems with the experimental design were discovered, the XM148 was replaced by AAI Corporation's conceptually similar M203 design, which became the primary grenade launcher used by the US armed forces and others until its ongoing replacement with the M320.

== Description ==
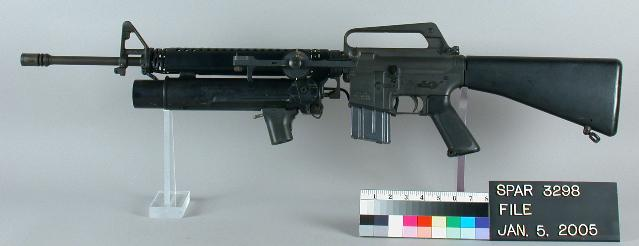
The XM148 mounted to an early Colt AR-15 rifle.

The Colt XM148 grenade launcher was created by Colt's Design Project Engineer, gun designer Karl R. Lewis. The May 1967 "Colt's Ink" newsletter announced that he had won a national competition for his selection and treatment of materials in the design. The newsletter stated in part, "In only 47 days, he wrote the specifications, designed the launcher, drew all the original prints, and had a working model built."

The weapon was designed for installation below the barrel of M16-type rifles, and was intended to replace the stand-alone M79 correcting the problem of grenadiers relying on pistols as a secondary weapon.

In July 1966 the US Government contracted Colt Firearms to provide nearly 20,000 XM-148s with the weapon arriving in South Vietnam in December 1966. The weapon was pulled from service in the fall of 1967.

Originally made for use with the M16 Rifle, the XM148 was used by US Special Forces in conjunction with the XM177E2 and the Australian Special Air Service Regiment in conjunction with the modified L1A1 and Sterling Submachine Gun. The weapon was also adopted by the United States Air Force Security Forces in 1968.

== Problems ==
The launcher's barrel could slide forward to accept a single 40 mm round into the breech. It came with a primitive version of the quadrant sight later used with the M203. It differed from the later model by featuring an external cocking handle and an extended trigger that allowed the weapon to be fired without removing the hand from the rifle's pistol grip. This same extended trigger was also one source of the weapon's problems as it allowed accidental discharges of a loaded weapon if caught by tree branches, gear, or anything else capable of overcoming the 6 to 11 pound trigger pull.

Another problem with the weapon was that it was overcomplicated compared to the M203. It was difficult to disassemble and had many small parts that could be easily lost while cleaning the weapon in the field. Where the M203 broke down into receiver group, barrel group, hand guard group and quadrant sight (the quadrant sight being the smallest piece), the XM148 broke down into barrel, pistol grip, receiver, hand guard, quadrant sight, and several small pins and clips. These issues led the U.S. military to adopt the M203 over the XM148, though the U.S. Air Force did keep a number of the XM148s. In fact U.S. Air Force Security Forces were still being trained on the XM148 in lieu of the M203 as late as 1989. Some security police units still had them in their armories until the 1990s.

== Users ==
=== Former users ===
- Australia
- Kingdom of Laos
- South Vietnam
- United States: U.S. Army and U.S. Air Force.
- Vietnam

== See also ==
- XM174

== Sources ==
- TM 9-1005-249-14 Technical Manual Rifle, 5.56-mm, M16; Rifle, 5.56-mm, XM16E1; and Launcher, Grenade, 40-mm, XM148 dated 1 August 1966 (reprint)
- Patent US 3279114 A Grenade launcher
- Gordon L. Rottman, US Grenade Launchers – M79, M203, and M320, Weapon series 57, Osprey Publishing Ltd, Oxford 2017. ISBN 978 1 4728 1952 9
