= Panzerwurfkanone 10H64 =

10 cm Panzerabwehrwerfer 1000 / 10cm Panzerwurfkanone 10H64
- Type: Anti-tank gun
- Place of origin: Germany

Service history
- Used by: Nazi Germany
- Wars: World War II

Production history
- Designer: Krupp
- Designed: 1944-1945
- No. built: prototypes

Specifications
- Mass: 1035 kg
- Caliber: 105 mm
- Carriage: split tubular trail
- Elevation: -5 to +30°
- Traverse: 60°
- Muzzle velocity: 550-600 m/s
- Effective firing range: ?, at least 750 m (anti-tank)
- Maximum firing range: ?, at least 6200 m (high explosive)

The 10 cm PAW 1000 - later re-designated 10H64 - was a lightweight anti-tank gun that utilized a high-low pressure system to fire hollow charge warheads (and most likely high explosive and smoke shells).

== Description ==
=== Background ===
By 1943, it was becoming obvious to the German army that conventional anti-tank gun design had reached its practical limits. Traditional high-velocity guns that relied on kinetic energy to defeat heavily armored targets were becoming so bulky in order to deal with the new generation of tanks that they were becoming too heavy for front line use, and too expensive to produce.

=== Rheinmetall ===
Rheinmetall Borsig proposed a new medium velocity gun with a smoothbore barrel that relied on hollow charge ammunition to defeat tanks. The design used the High-Low Pressure principle where the high pressures generated by the propellant did not act directly on the projectile but instead seeped into the main chamber at a controlled rate. This allowed a very simple light-weight barrel with a conventional heavy breech. A simple light-weight carriage was designed for the weapon.

The resulting 8 cm PAW 600 (8H63) gun fired a warhead based on the 8.1 cm mortar hollow charge bomb that could penetrate 140mm of armor plate to a maximum effective range of 750 meters. Some 260 pieces were produced between December 1944 and the end of the war.

=== Krupp ===
Meanwhile, Krupp was developing a 10 cm design known as the 10 cm PAW 1000 or 10H64, although by the end of the war they had produced only prototypes. Its shaped charge shell weighed 6.6 kg and with an effective range of 1,000 meters was able to penetrate 200 mm steel at 60° (note that this is most likely the degree system, which means that the armor is at 60° from the vertical to the flight path. The effect of angling like this is rather small, whereas 60° angling by the other definition (60° angle to the flight path) has about a doubling effect on the effective armor thickness).

=== Steel quality ===
The steel quality used for such measurements in World War II is also not necessarily identical to RHA (Rolled homogenous armor), as it is used to measure the armor penetration capability of post-World War II munitions.

A ratio of 2 between caliber and penetration was good by World War II standards and is explained by the late design and lack of penetration degrading spin (the 10H64 had a smoothbore barrel and fin stabilized shells). 200mm penetration would have been enough to defeat all existing tanks of World War II unless the angle of impact prevented proper fusing.

=== Caliber and gun carriage ===
The exact caliber is somewhat uncertain. Officially, it was 10 cm, but in the German designation system this typically meant 10.5 cm. The basis for the caliber and ammunition would likely have been the 10 cm Nebelwerfer 35, a mortar of 105mm caliber used in small numbers by mountain troops.

The gun carriage for the prototypes was that of the 5 cm Pak 38 or the Sonderlafette V1. Both were only waist-high and would have easily been sited and camouflaged well within their maximum effective range.

== Conclusion ==
The PAW was a very special development that enabled low-cost guns on old carriages to defeat the most modern tanks of World War II. Its maximum effective range was surpassed by classic anti-tank guns due to its rather low muzzle velocity, but the non-spinning shaped-charge shells offered effective anti-tank capability at ranges that exceeded the envelope of portable weapons.

== Nomenclature changes ==
In 1944-1945, the Germans changed their system of artillery designations from the old "year" system. Each weapon was to have a number showing its caliber group, a letter denoting the ammunition group, and the last two digits were from the weapon drawing number. In this case, 10 denoted 100 mm caliber using the H group of ammunition.
