= List of 40 mm grenades =

Grenade suitable for use with a grenade launcher

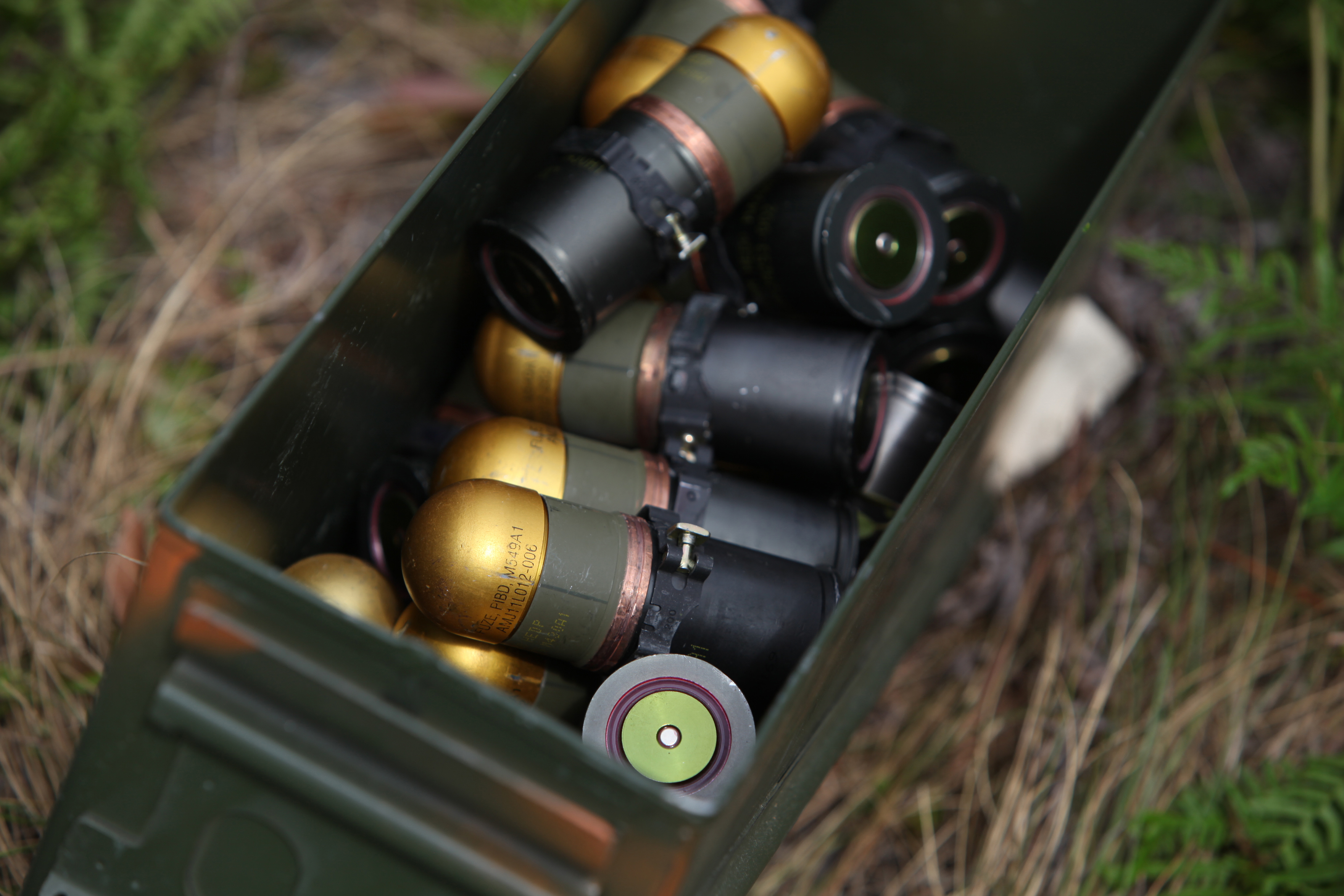
Box full of 40×53 mm high-velocity grenades

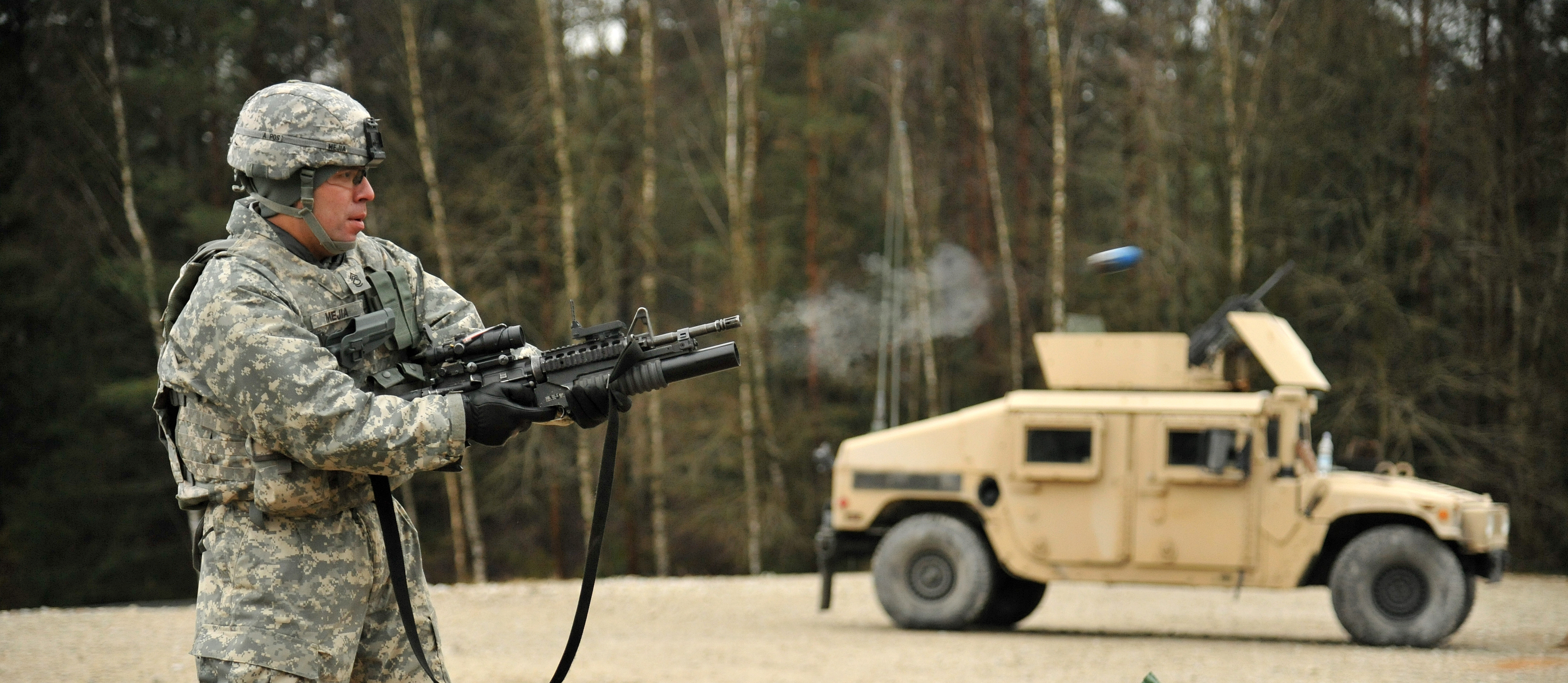
A 40×46 mm low-velocity training round being fired from an M203 grenade launcher

This is a general collection of the world's many types of ammunition for grenade launchers in 40 mm (1.57 in) caliber.

Several countries have developed or adopted 40 mm-caliber grenade launchers.

== NATO ==
NATO currently uses three standardized 40 mm grenade families: 40 mm low-velocity (LV), 40 mm medium-velocity (MV), and 40 mm high-velocity (HV). Low- and medium-velocity cartridges are used for different hand-held grenade launchers, while the high-velocity cartridge is used for automatic grenade launchers.

=== 40×46 mm LV (40 mm low velocity) ===
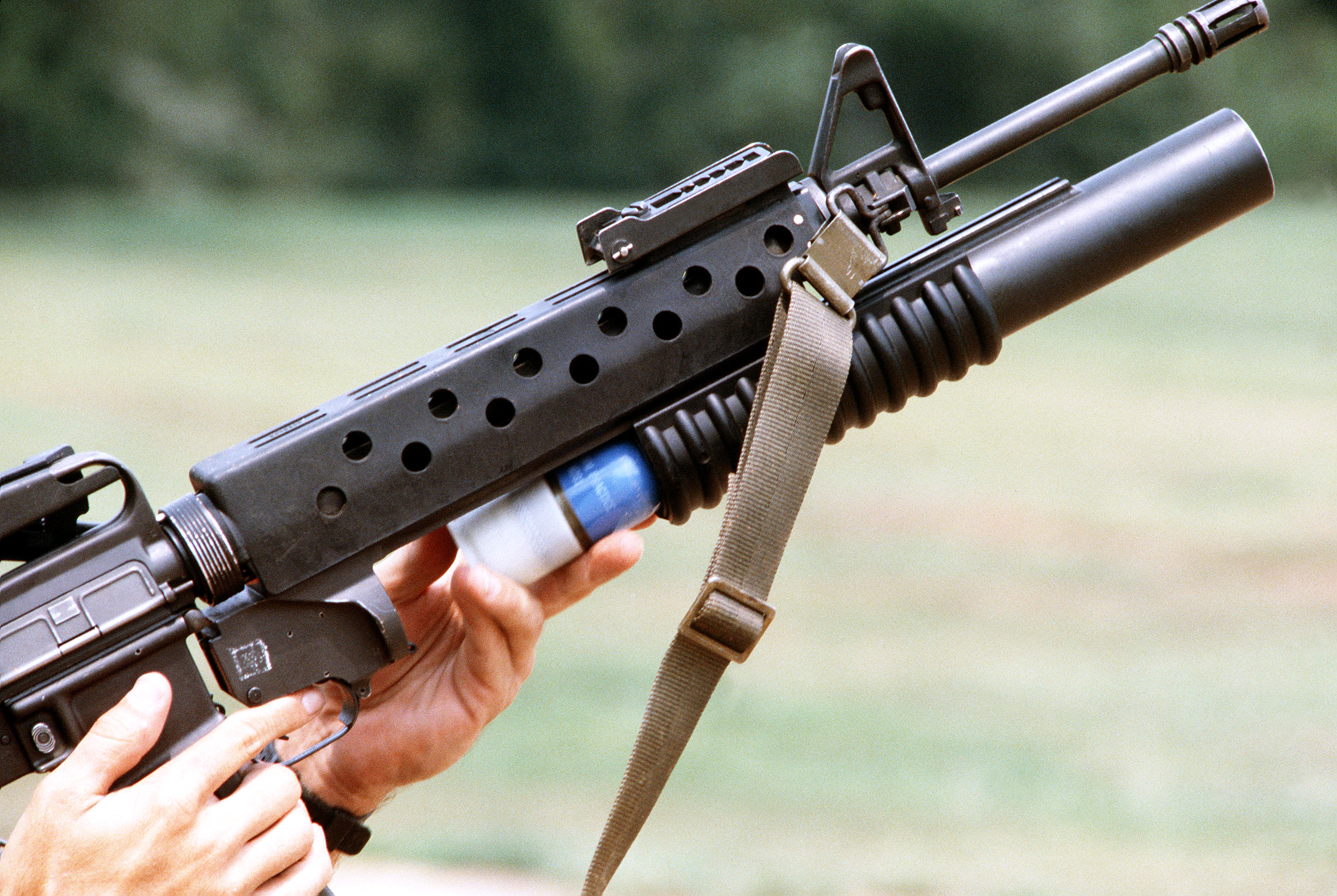
A 40×46 mm low-velocity cartridge being loaded into an M203 grenade launcher attached to an M16A1

High–low system casing for the 40×46 mm low-velocity cartridge
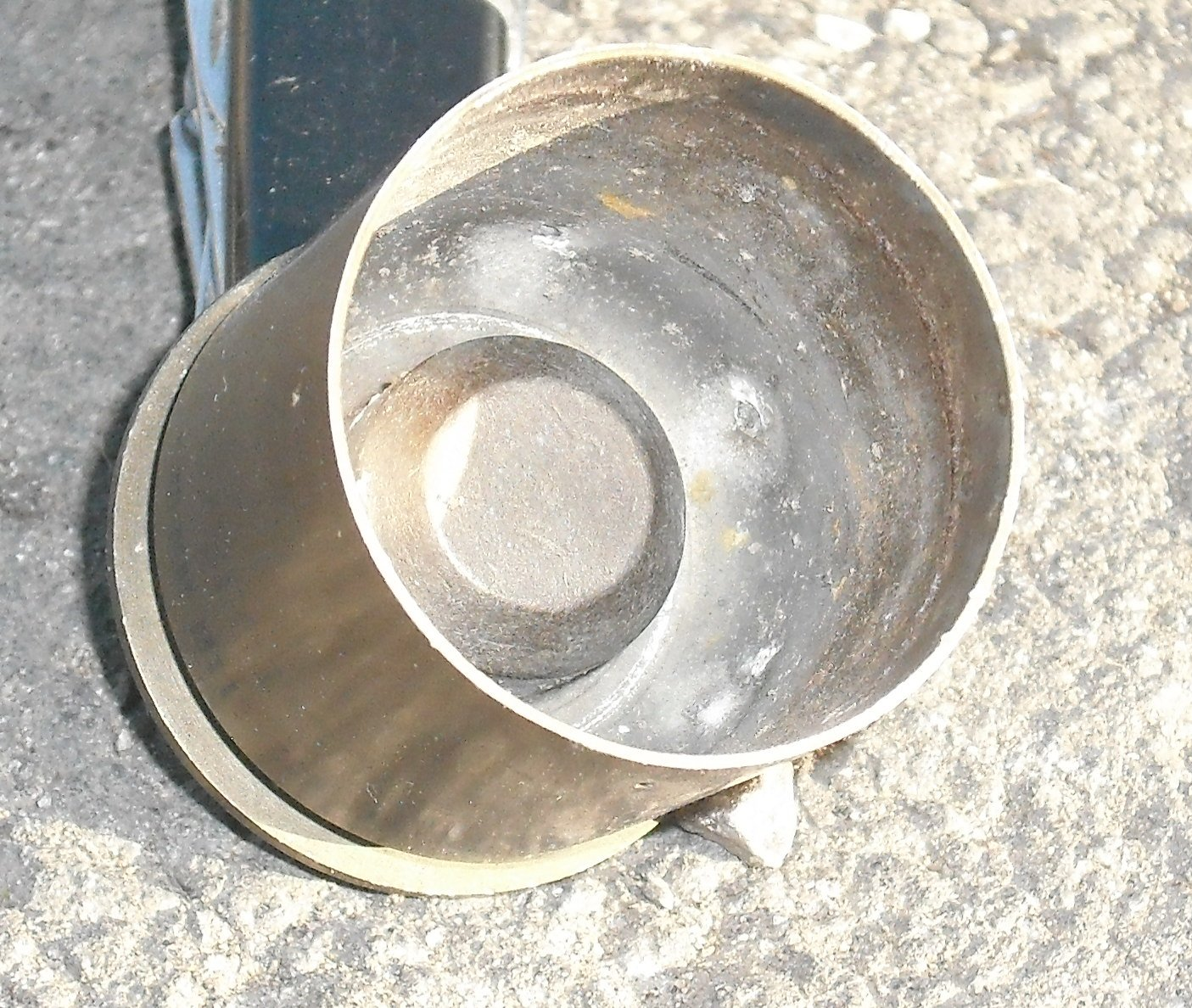
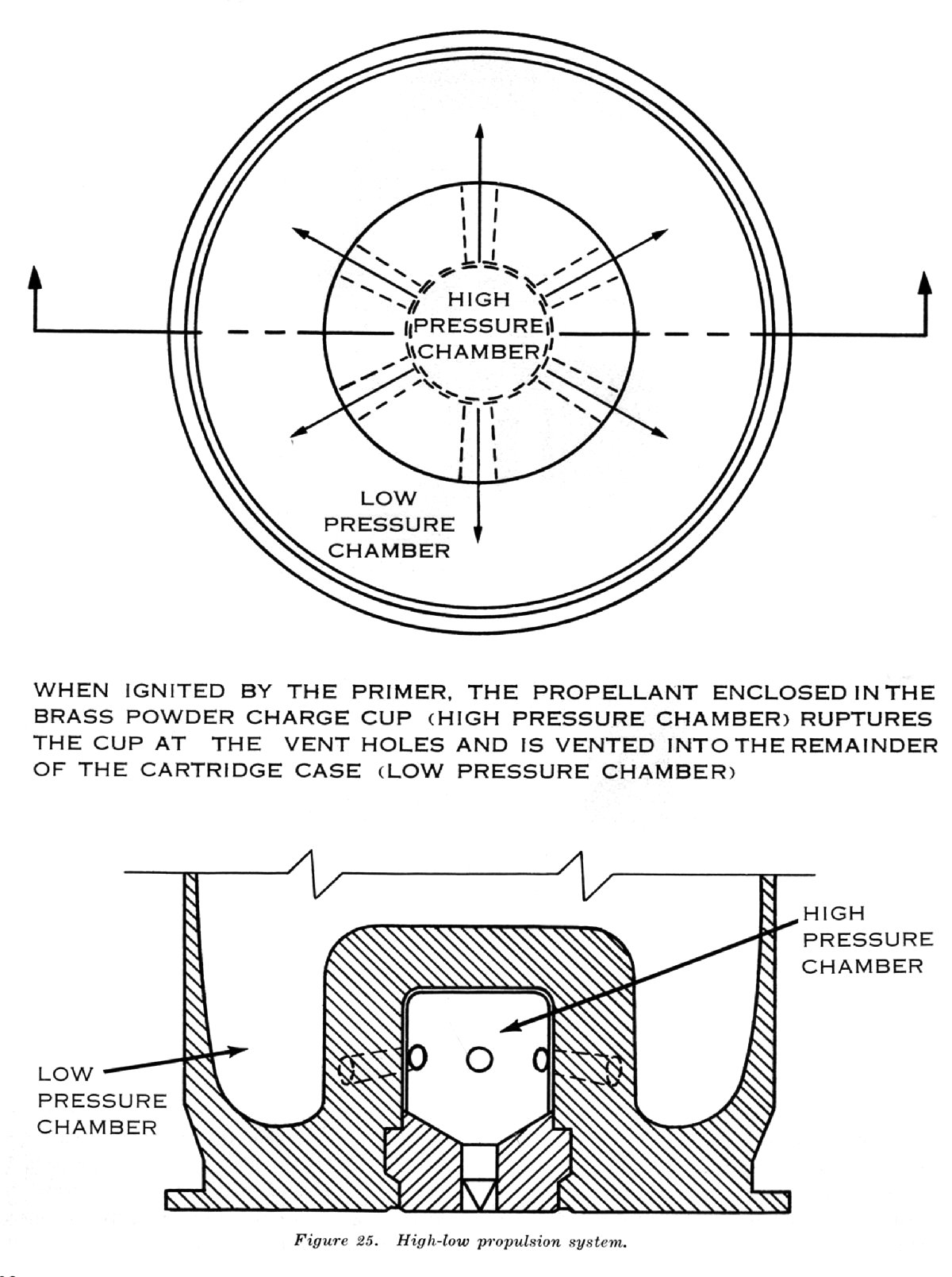

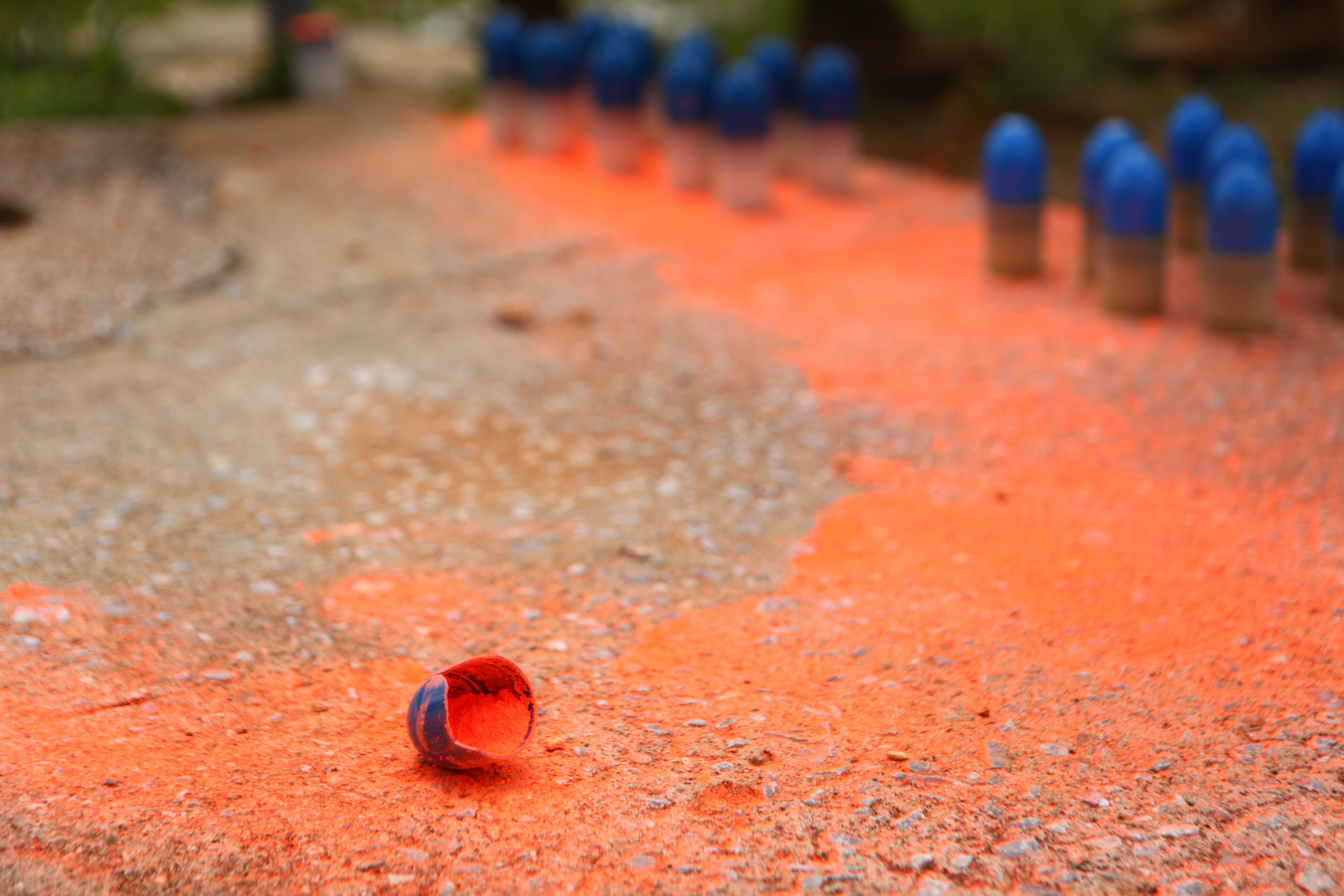
Fired 40 mm low-velocity M781 showing its orange signal chalk

40×46 mm LV (low velocity) is a NATO-standard high–low grenade launcher cartridge meant for hand-held grenade launchers, such as the M79, M203, Milkor MGL, Heckler & Koch AG36 and M320 Grenade Launcher Module.

The propellant has low pressure and gives the projectile an average velocity of 78–84 m/s (256–276 ft/s) depending on the ammunition type.

==== 40 mm low-velocity ammunition types (NATO) ====
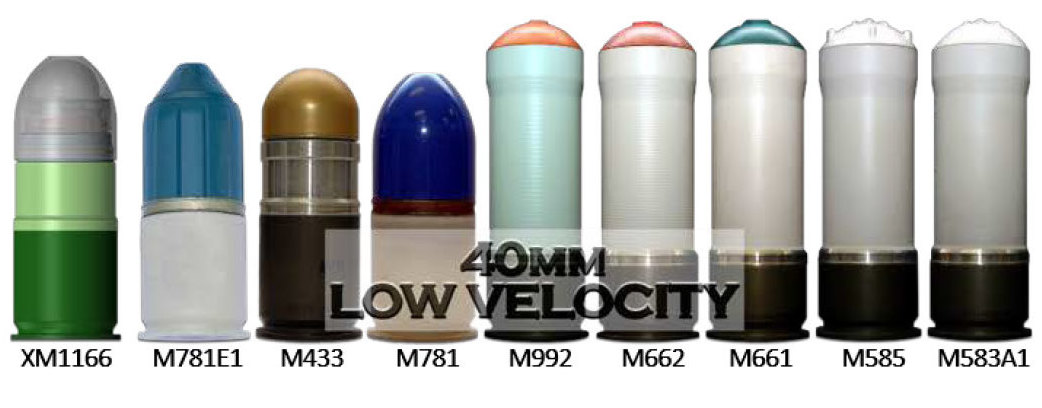

HE, high explosive
M381; HE, high explosive Basic high-explosive shell.	
M386; HE, high explosive Basic high-explosive shell.	Missing image
M406; HE, high explosive Basic high-explosive shell.	
M441; HE, high explosive Basic high-explosive shell.	Missing image

AB, air burst
M397, M397A1 AB, air burst Octol filled fragmentation grenade with a time fuze. The A1 has a different fuze from the regular M397.	Missing image

DP, dual purpose
M433; HEDP, high-explosive dual-purpose Shaped charge with ability to damage soft targets and penetrate armor. Armor penetration: 2.5 inches (63 millimeters).
M433A1 HEDP M433A1 uses the improved M550A1 fuze. The projectile consists of a copper-shaped charge in an explosive-filled steel cup covered with tungsten spherical fragments over-molded with a plastic aerodynamic body.

MP, multiple projectile
M576; MP-APERS, multiple projectile anti-personnel Buckshot cartridge with twenty 24-grain bullets. Main article: M576 40 mm grenade	Missing image

IL, illumination
M583A1; Illumination/signal flare, parachute star (white flare); Flare grenade with parachute for illumination and signaling.	
M585; Illumination/signal flare, cluster star (white flare); Grenade containing five nose-ejected, free-falling pyrotechnic star pellets used for signaling.	Missing image
M661; Illumination/signal flare, parachute star (green flare); Flare grenade with parachute for illumination and signaling.	Missing image
M662; Illumination/signal flare, parachute star (red flare); Flare grenade with parachute for illumination and signaling.	Missing image
M992; Infra-red illumination flare Flare grenade with parachute for infrared illumination. Main article: M992 (40mm munition)	

S, smoke
M676; Smoke canopy (yellow smoke); Smoke grenade with parachute for signaling and marking.	Missing image
M680; Smoke canopy (white smoke); Smoke grenade with parachute for signaling and marking.	Missing image
M682; Smoke canopy (red smoke); Smoke grenade with parachute for signaling and marking.	Missing image
M713; Ground marker (red smoke); Smoke grenade for signaling and marking.	Missing image
M714; Ground marker (white smoke); Smoke grenade for signaling and marking.	Missing image
M715; Ground marker (green smoke); Smoke grenade for signaling and marking.	Missing image
M716; Ground marker (yellow smoke); Smoke grenade for signaling and marking.	Missing image

G, gas
M651; CS gas Tear gas grenade.	Missing image

TB, thermobaric
XM1060; Thermobaric; The XM1060 is a 40 mm thermobaric grenade developed by Picatinny Arsenal.	Missing image

P, practice
M781; P, practice Training ammunition consisting of a steel body filled with orange signal chalk capped with a plastic ogive cap.

Besides combat ammo, there is also crowd-control ammunition such as sponge grenades.

==== 40 mm low-velocity ammunition types (Sweden) ====
Sweden currently operates the M203 grenade launcher (designated Granattillsats 40 mm Automatkarbin in Sweden) and thus uses the 40 mm low-velocity cartridge. Going against Swedish military tradition, the 40 mm low-velocity cartridge currently lacks a specified indigenous designation in Swedish service. Instead only the projectile types have designations.

Currently, these projectile types can be found in Swedish service manuals.

(Sweden) HE, high explosive
40 GSGR
HE, high explosive
Name: 40 GSGR, abbreviation for 40 mm gevärsspränggranat, Swedish for 40 mm rifle high-explosive grenade. The fuze is designated ÖHKBAR 40 GSGR, an abbreviation for ögonblickligt högkänsligt basanslagsrör + shell designation, Swedish for 'instant high sensitivity base impact fuze'.
Description: The type is a high-explosive grenade meant against soft targets.
Construction: The shell consists of a fragmentation body outfitted with internal steel balls for extra fragmentation damage. A highly sensitive, zero-delay fuze is located at the bottom of the shell.
Marking: The shell has a yellow head and green body. The side of the shell features the marking "ST" in yellow, which stands for stålkulor ('steel balls').

40 GSGR data
Cartridge weight	0.264 kg (0.58 lb)
Shell weight	0.19 kg (0.42 lb)
Primary charge	3 g (0.11 oz) PETN
Main charge	23 g (0.81 oz) RDX
Propellant	0.35 g (0.012 oz) NCGL
High pressure	70 MPa
Low pressure	15 MPa
Muzzle velocity	84 m/s (280 ft/s)
NEM (Note: NEM = Net Explosive Mass)	26 g (0.92 oz)
Sources	

Missing image

(Sweden) DP, dual purpose
40 GPSGR
HEDP, high-explosive dual-purpose
Name: 40 GPSGR, abbreviation for 40 mm gevärspansarspränggranat, Swedish for "40 mm rifle high explosive anti-tank grenade".
Description: The type is a high-explosive dual-purpose grenade meant for use against both soft and lightly protected targets. It is probably equivalent to the American 40 mm M433.
Construction: The shell consists of a fragmentation body, a high-explosive charge and a shaped charge.
Marking: The shell has a green head and green body. The side of the shell features the marking "RSV" in yellow, which stands for riktad sprängverkan ("shaped charge", lit. "directed explosive effect").

40 GPSGR data
Cartridge weight	0.26 kg (0.57 lb)
Shell weight	0.19 kg (0.42 lb)
Primary charge	0.33 g (0.012 oz) CH-6
Main charge	43.5 g (1.5 oz) Comp A5 (Note: Comp A5 = Composition A5. Comp A5 is Hexogen + graphite according to Swedish manuals.)
Propellant	0.34 g (0.012 oz) NCGL
High pressure	70 MPa
Low pressure	15 MPa
Muzzle velocity	78 m/s (260 ft/s)
NEM (Note: NEM = Net Explosive Mass)	44.3 g (1.6 oz)
Sources	

Missing image

(Sweden) P, Practice
40 GÖVNGR 07
P, practice
Name: 40 GÖVNGR 07, abbreviation for 40 mm gevärsövningsgranat 07, Swedish for 40 mm rifle practice grenade 07.
Description: The type is a practice shell for combat training and practice shooting.
Construction: The shell has a steel body with a plastic cap and is filled with red signal chalk.
Marking: The shell is colored in NATO blue training color.

40 GÖVNGR 07 data
Cartridge weight	0.26 kg (0.57 lb)
Shell weight	0.19 kg (0.42 lb)
Primary charge	-
Main charge	Red signal chalk
Propellant	0.47 g (0.017 oz) NCGL
High pressure	70 MPa
Low pressure	15 MPa
Muzzle velocity	78 m/s (260 ft/s)
NEM (Note: NEM = Net Explosive Mass)	5 g (0.18 oz)
Sources	

Missing image

Mockups and inert types also exist for loading exercises and educational purposes.

==== 40 mm low-velocity ammunition types (Romania) ====
Romanian arms producer ROMARM has produced a version of their 40 mm rifle-mounted grenade launcher, AG-40, chambered in 40×46 mm NATO (then designated AG-40PN). Production of Romanian 40 mm low-velocity ammunition is handled by the arms factory Uzina Mecanica Plopeni, a subsidiary of ROMARM. The projectiles seem to be of Romanian origin based on available information.

(Romania) HE, high explosive
Grenade 40 NATO Exploziva
HE, high explosive
Description: Romanian 40×46 mm low-velocity high-explosive cartridge.
Construction: The shell is made of steel and has a point fuze. The main explosive charge is located at the bottom of the shell. Below the main explosive charge is a layer of metal balls for extra fragmentation damage.

Grenade 40 NATO Exploziva data
Cartridge length	112 mm (4.4 in)
Cartridge weight	370 g (13 oz)
Shell weight	245 g (8.6 oz)
Muzzle velocity	75 m/s (250 ft/s)
Lethal radius	10 m (33 ft)
Self-destruct	16-23 s
Sources	

Missing image

(Romania) P, practice
Grenade 40 NATO Inerta
P, practice
Name: The cartridge is named Inerta (inert), but the cartridge is live. Inert refers to the projectile, which is a solid material projectile.
Description: Romanian 40×46 mm low-velocity practice cartridge.
Construction: The shell is solid in construction and made of duralumin.

Grenade 40 NATO Exploziva data
Cartridge length	112 mm (4.4 in)
Cartridge weight	370 g (13 oz)
Shell weight	245 g (8.6 oz)
Muzzle velocity	75 m/s (250 ft/s)
Lethal radius	-
Self-destruct	-
Sources	

Missing image

==== SAGM fuze ====
The United States Army Armament Research, Development and Engineering Center (ARDEC) began development of a 40 mm smart airburst fuze (proximity fuze) in 2011 to improve the ability of grenade launchers like the M203 and M320 to engage targets in defilade. Called small arms grenade munitions (SAGMs), they double the lethality of the standard M433 grenade round by adding a small "smart" fuze sensor that detonates in the air to hit targets in cover or behind obstacles. The airburst function is similar to the XM25 CDTE, which has an onboard laser system to determine the distance to the target, but SAGMs are considered complementary to the XM25 rather than competing against it, as the XM25 provides low-angle fire while 40 mm launchers fire a lobbing trajectory. Integrated sensors and logic devices scan and filter the environment, then autonomously airburst the fuze without being told by the firer, thereby not requiring the soldier to carry extra weapon accessories. SAGMs enable soldiers to accurately incapacitate personnel targets in defilade at ranges between 50 and 500 meters. The round is engineered with three firing modes: airburst, point detonation, and self-destruct. A successful demonstration occurred in November 2013. Although the SAGM sensor does not need a laser rangefinder or any pre-fire programming sequence, it does require some skill by the user to aim and fire the round correctly so that it can detect the wall or obstruction to detonate in the air. The SAGM was to undergo evaluation in July 2015 and, if successful, transition into an official Army Program of Record by the end of the year. Not only does the fuze burst over walls, but it can detonate when passing cover like trees, bursting just as it senses and passes the trunk. The sort of sensor SAGMs use to differentiate clutter from triggering obstacles is highly classified, but shows airburst reliability of 76 percent.

=== 40×51 mm MV (40 mm medium velocity) ===
40×51 mm MV (medium velocity), also known as 40×51 mm extended range low pressure (ERLP), is a NATO-standard high–low grenade launcher cartridge meant for hand-held grenade launchers. Its purpose is to serve as an intermediate cartridge between the 40×46 mm low-velocity and 40×53 mm high-velocity cartridges and is thus referred to as the 40 mm medium-velocity cartridge.

The propellant has medium pressure and gives the projectile an average velocity of 100 m/s (328 ft/s) depending on the ammunition type. It has a maximum range of 800 meters, exceeding conventional extended range low-velocity variants by up to 375 meters.

The 40×51 mm MV cartridge was designed by Rheinmetall Denel Munitions for the US Special Operations Command (USSOCOM) after a 2008 requirement for enhanced range and lethality from hand-held 40 mm grenades. Rheinmetall answered by developing a new family of 40 mm grenades named 40 mm medium velocity and by 2019 the cartridge was undergoing NATO qualification.

Besides NATO the cartridge has been ordered by the South African National Defence Force (SANDF) as the cartridge for their next generation multiple grenade launcher, the Milkor Y4. SANDF approved acquisition in February 2018 but deliveries could not be finished until the end of 2020 due to the COVID-19 pandemic.

=== 40×53 mm HV (40 mm high velocity) ===
40 mm high-velocity high-explosive dual-purpose M430A1 cartridge

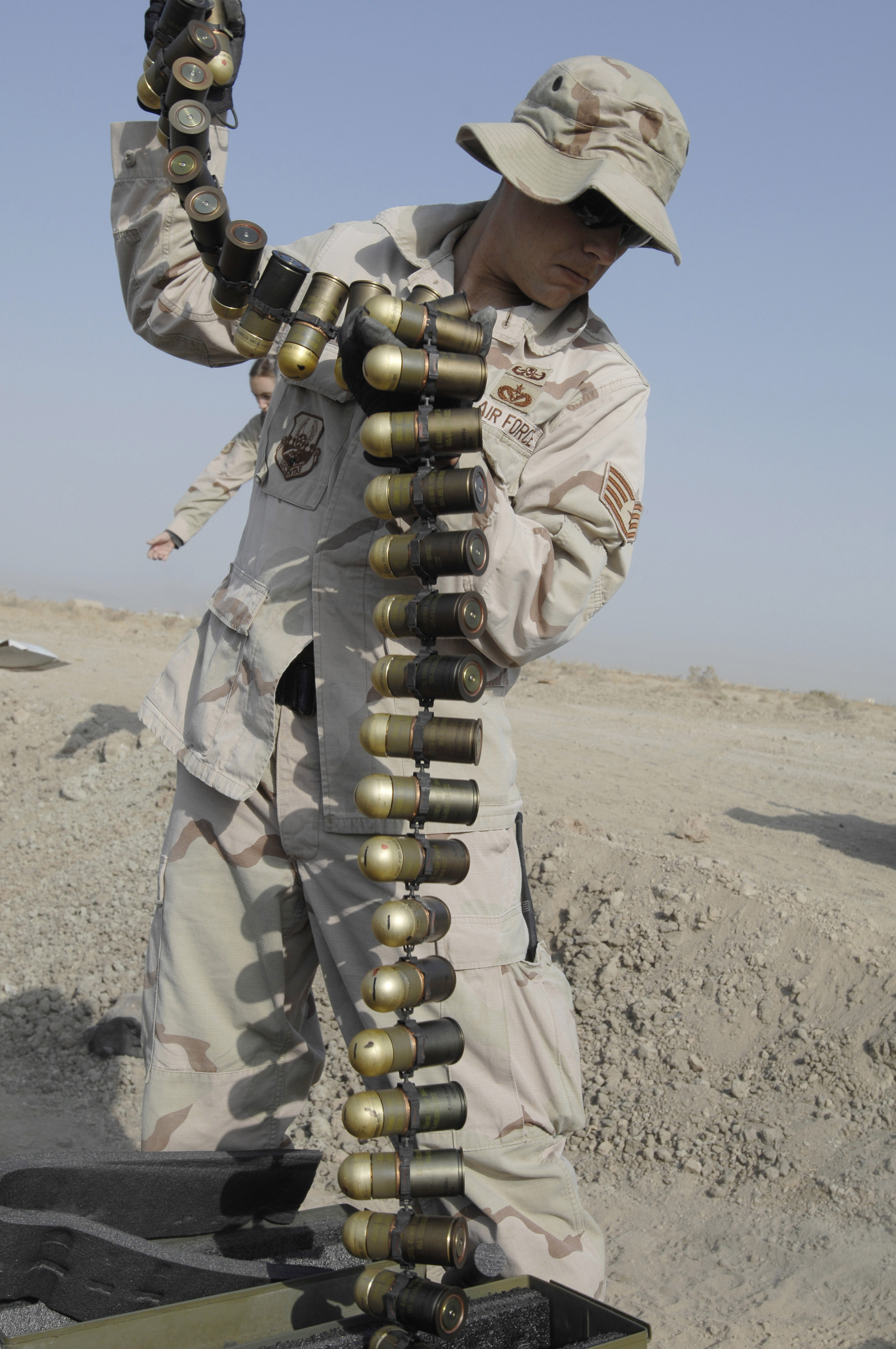
40×53 mm high-velocity ammunition belt

40×53 mm HV (high velocity) is a NATO-standard high–low grenade launcher cartridge meant for mounted or crew-served automatic grenade launchers, such as the Mk.19 AGL, Mk 47 Striker, HK GMG, STK 40 AGL, and Daewoo K4.

The propellant has high pressure and gives the projectile an average velocity of 241 m/s (791 ft/s) depending on the ammunition type.

==== 40 mm high-velocity ammunition types (NATO) ====
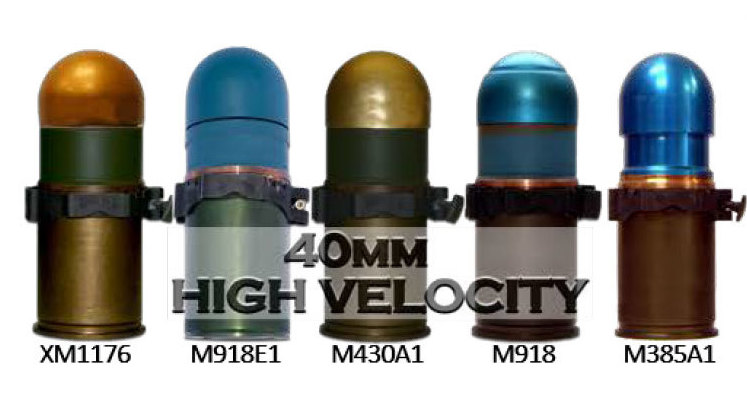

HE, high explosive
M383; HE, high explosive High explosive shell filled with composition A5. (Comp 5A = hexogen + graphite according to Swedish manuals). Wound radius: 15 meters. Arms: 18-36 meters	Missing image
M384; HE, high explosive High explosive shell filled with composition A5. (Comp 5A = hexogen + graphite according to Swedish manuals).	Missing image

DP, dual purpose
M430, M430A1; HEDP, high-explosive dual-purpose M430: Shaped charge with ability to damage soft targets and penetrate armor. It arms within 18 to 30 meters of the gun muzzle and has a point-initiating, base-detonating (PIBD) fuze. Armor penetration: 2 inches (51 millimetres). of steel armor at 0-degree obliquity Inflict personnel casualties: 15 meters from impact M430A1: Has a longer shaped charge than the M430 and penetrates more armor. Armor penetration: 3 inches (76 millimetres).

CA, canister
M1001; HVCC, high-velocity canister cartridge Canister shot containing several flechettes. Produces a 3 to 4 ft (0.91 to 1.2 m) wide dispersion pattern at 50 m (164 ft).	Missing image

AB, air burst
XM1176; HEDP-AB, high-explosive dual-purpose air burst Dual purpose shaped charge with programmable fuze for air burst functionality. Main article: XM1176	
MK285; PPHE/SD, programmable prefragmented high explosive/self-destructible The MK285 is an anti-personnel cartridge designed for the Mk 47 Striker automatic grenade launcher. It consists of an electronic programmable fuze, a pre-fragmented warhead, and a propulsion system. The gun's fire control programs the fuze. The fuze is mechanically armed at approximately 23 meters. The round is programmed to airburst over the target, and the fuze counts down the programmed time via its built-in electronics. If an unprogrammed round is fired, it will detonate on impact. The projectile has a built-in self-destruct and can be fired by any automatic grenade launcher.	Missing image

P, practice
M385, M385A1; P, practice M385: Training round featuring a solid metal projectile. M385A1: Updated M385 featuring an ogive equal to the M430 HEDP round.	Missing image
M918; P, practice. The M918 is a training practice cartridge that has the same muzzle velocity of 790 feet per second (fps), signature, and sound as the HE round.	Missing image
M922, M922A1; Dummy round Trainers use dummy rounds to check weapon function and to train crews.	Missing image
MK281 Mod 0, MK281 Mod 1 P, practice MK281 Mod 0: Training round featuring an impact marker. MK281 Mod 1: Training round featuring a day-night marker.	Missing image

==== 40 mm high-velocity ammunition types (Sweden) ====
Sweden currently operates the Mk 19 grenade launcher (designated 40 mm granatspruta 92 in Sweden) and thus uses the 40 mm high-velocity cartridge. Going against Swedish military tradition, the 40 mm high-velocity cartridge currently lacks a specified indigenous designation in Swedish service. Instead only the projectile types have designations.

Currently, these projectile types can be found in Swedish service manuals.

(Sweden) DP, dual purpose
40 PSGR
HEDP, high-explosive dual-purpose
Name: 40 PSGR, abbreviation for 40 mm pansarspränggranat, Swedish for 40 mm high explosive anti-tank grenade. The fuze is designated ÖHKSAR PSGR, an abbreviation for ögonblickligt högkänsligt spetsanslagsrör + shell designation, Swedish for instant high-sensitivity point-impact fuze.
Description: The type is a high-explosive dual-purpose grenade meant for use against both soft and lightly protected targets. It is probably equivalent to the American 40 mm M430.
Construction: The shell consists of a fragmentation body, a high-explosive charge, and a shaped charge. The fuze is a highly sensitive, non-delayed device located at the top of the shell.
Marking: The shell has a gold head and green body. The side of the shell features the marking "RSV" in yellow, which stands for riktad sprängverkan ("shaped charge", lit. "directed explosive effect").

40 PSGR data
Cartridge weight	0.34 kg (0.75 lb)
Shell weight	0.25 kg (0.55 lb)
Primary charge	0.3 g (0.011 oz) Comp A3 (Note: Comp A3 = Composition A3. Comp A3 is Hexogen + wax according to Swedish manuals.)
Main charge	33 g (1.2 oz) Comp A5 (Note: Comp A5 = Composition A5. Comp A5 is Hexogen + graphite according to Swedish manuals.)
Propellant	4.45 g (0.16 oz) NCGL M2
High pressure	286 MPa
Low pressure	94 MPa
Muzzle velocity	241 m/s (790 ft/s)
Shaped charge penetration	50 mm (2 in) of steel at 0 degrees obliquity at any range.
NEM (Note: NEM = Net Explosive Mass)	38 g (1.3 oz)
Sources	

(Sweden) P, practice
40 ÖVNGR
P, practice
Name: 40 ÖVNGR, abbreviation for 40 mm övningsgranat, Swedish for "40 mm practice grenade".
Description: The type is a practice shell for combat training and practice shooting. It is probably equivalent to the American 40 mm M918.
Construction: The shell has a flash charge instead of a combat charge.
Marking: The shell is colored in NATO blue training color at the top.

40 ÖVNGR data
Cartridge weight	0.37 kg (0.82 lb)
Shell weight	0.25 kg (0.55 lb)
Primary charge	—
Main charge	1.8 g (0.063 oz) flash charge
Propellant	3.5 g (0.12 oz) NC A/S 0200
High pressure	286 MPa
Low pressure	94 MPa
Muzzle velocity	241 m/s (790 ft/s)
NEM (Note: NEM = Net Explosive Mass)	5.6 g (0.20 oz)
Sources	

40 ÖVNGR 07
P, practice
Name: 40 ÖVNGR 07, abbreviation for 40 mm övningsgranat 07, Swedish for "40 mm practice grenade 07".
Description: The type is a practice shell for combat training and practice shooting.
Construction: The shell has a steel body with a plastic cap and is filled with orange signal chalk.
Marking: The shell is colored in NATO blue training color. The side of the shell features a white marking of the cartridge designation.

40 ÖVNGR 07 data
Cartridge weight	0.37 kg (0.82 lb)
Shell weight	0.25 kg (0.55 lb)
Primary charge	-
Main charge	Orange signal chalk
Propellant	4 g (0.14 oz) NCGL
High pressure	286 MPa
Low pressure	94 MPa
Muzzle velocity	241 m/s (790 ft/s)
NEM (Note: NEM = Net Explosive Mass)	4.8 g (0.17 oz)
Sources	

Mockups and inert types also exist for loading exercises and educational purposes.

==== Green ammunition ====
The MK281 is a new type of 40 mm target practice grenade ammunition that has been accepted for use by the United States Marine Corps and the United States Army. It is "green" because it is non-toxic and non-dud-producing (since it is a training round), meaning that there is no unexploded ordnance left to clean up on the range, and heavy metals in the fuze do not leak into the ground. The MK281 was introduced into parts of the U.S. Armed Forces due to an executive order mandating the purchase of green ammunition. The MK281 is manufactured by an American subsidiary of the Rheinmetall Group.

The United States Army requires a non-dud producing 40 mm training ammunition in both high- and low-velocity variants. The Army awarded four contracts to three United States companies to test designs. The resulting ammunition will not contain explosive energetics and will have day-and-night visible, infrared, and thermal signatures.

== Other ==
=== 40×47 mm (Poland) ===
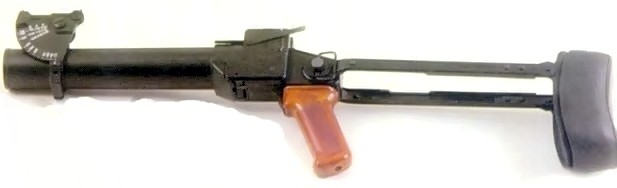
Pallad-D wz. 83

40×47 mm was a cartridge caliber produced in Poland for their Pallad wz. 74 rifle-mounted grenade launchers (used with the AK family of rifles in the Polish Army, like the AKM/AKMS, Tantal, and Beryl) and Pallad-D wz. 83 grenade launcher (standalone variant fitted with standard pistol grip and folding stock from the AKMS assault rifle). The construction is similar to the one used in 40×46 mm grenades, but they are not interchangeable.

=== 40×47 mm (Romania) ===
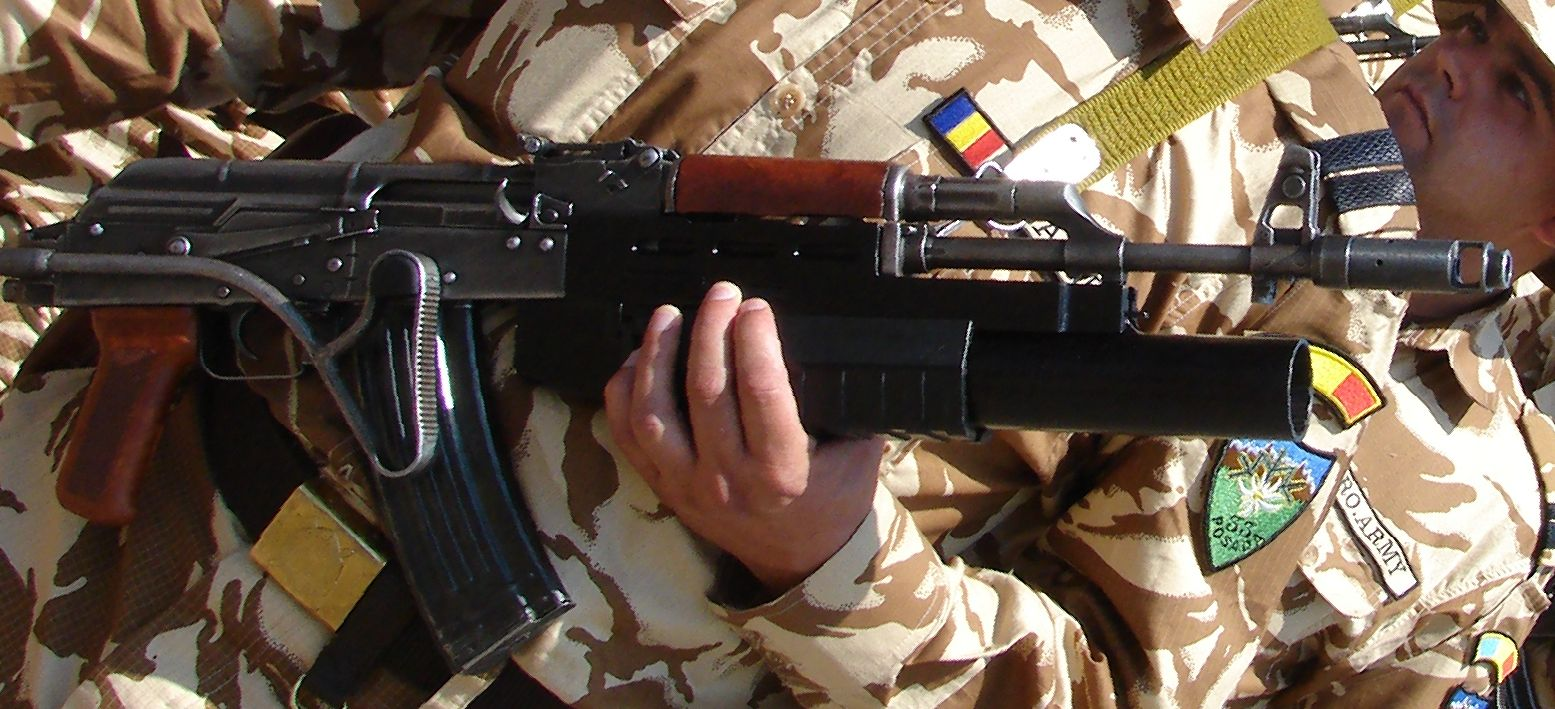
PA md. 86 assault rifle with 40 × 47 mm AG-40 grenade launcher

40×47 mm is a cartridge caliber produced in Romania for their AG-40 model 77 and model 80 (today AG-40P) rifle-mounted grenade launchers. It features a casing with a high–low system. The propellant has low pressure and gives the projectile an average velocity of 78–120 m/s (256–394 ft/s) depending on the ammunition type.

Production was originally handled by the arms factory Uzina Mecanica Filiasi; however, production was later moved to the arms factory Uzina Mecanica Tohan Zărnești, today more commonly known as S. Tohan S.A., a subsidiary of ROMARM.

Several types of the Romanian 40×47 mm exist:

- High explosive
- High-explosive fragmentation
- Smoke
- Incendiary
- Tear gas
- Practice, featuring a small flash charge and smoke signal.
- Inert

Tohan currently (2021) offers a 40×47 mm high explosive type called GETZ (Grenadă Explozivă Tohan Zărnești) and an inert version called GITZ (Grenadă Inertă Tohan Zărnești). Both cartridges are 105 mm (4.13 in) long, with GETZ weighing 0.260 kg (0.573 lb) and GITZ 0.200 kg (0.441 lb).

=== 40×74.5 mm (Romania) ===
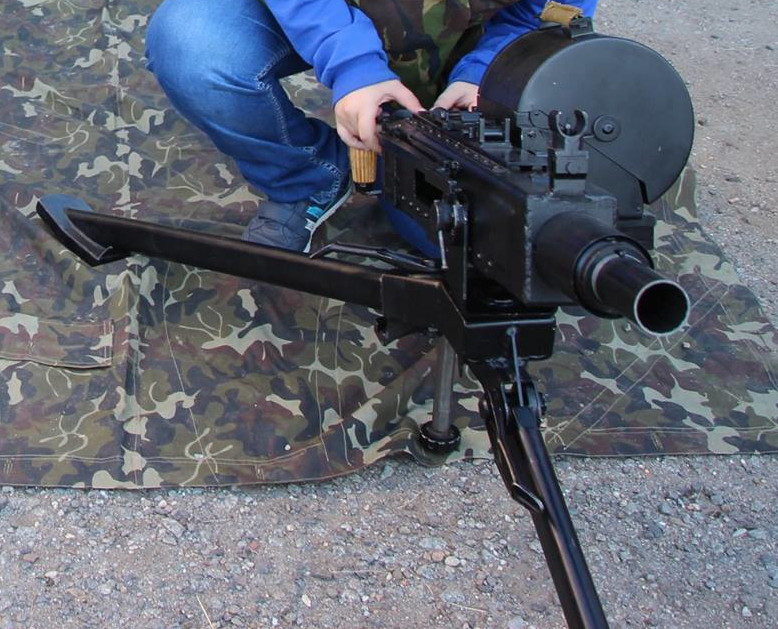
An AGA‑40 grenade launcher

40×74.5 mm is a cartridge caliber produced in Romania for their AGA-40 Model 85 automatic grenade launcher. It features a casing with a high–low system. The propellant has high pressure and gives the projectile an average velocity of 216–223 m/s (709–732 ft/s) depending on the ammunition type.

The arms factory Uzina Mecanica Plopeni, a subsidiary of ROMARM, handles production.

Three ammunition types are known:

- A high-explosive grenade producing 150 fragments weighing 0.2 g (0.0071 oz) each, creating a deadly radius of 10 meters (33 feet) upon impact.
- A high-explosive dual-purpose grenade capable of penetrating 50 mm (2.0 in) of steel armor.
- An inert cartridge for loading exercise.

=== 40×56mm (Japan) ===
The standard adopted by the Japan Ground Self-Defense Force in its Type 96 grenade launcher. It is manufactured by Daikin Industries, and the '40 mm anti-personnel light armour-piercing round' (ammunition length 112 mm, weight 371 g) is a multi-purpose grenade with a moulded explosive charge. There is also a '40 mm training round' available.

== Caseless ammunition ==
=== 40 mm VOG-25 (Russia) ===
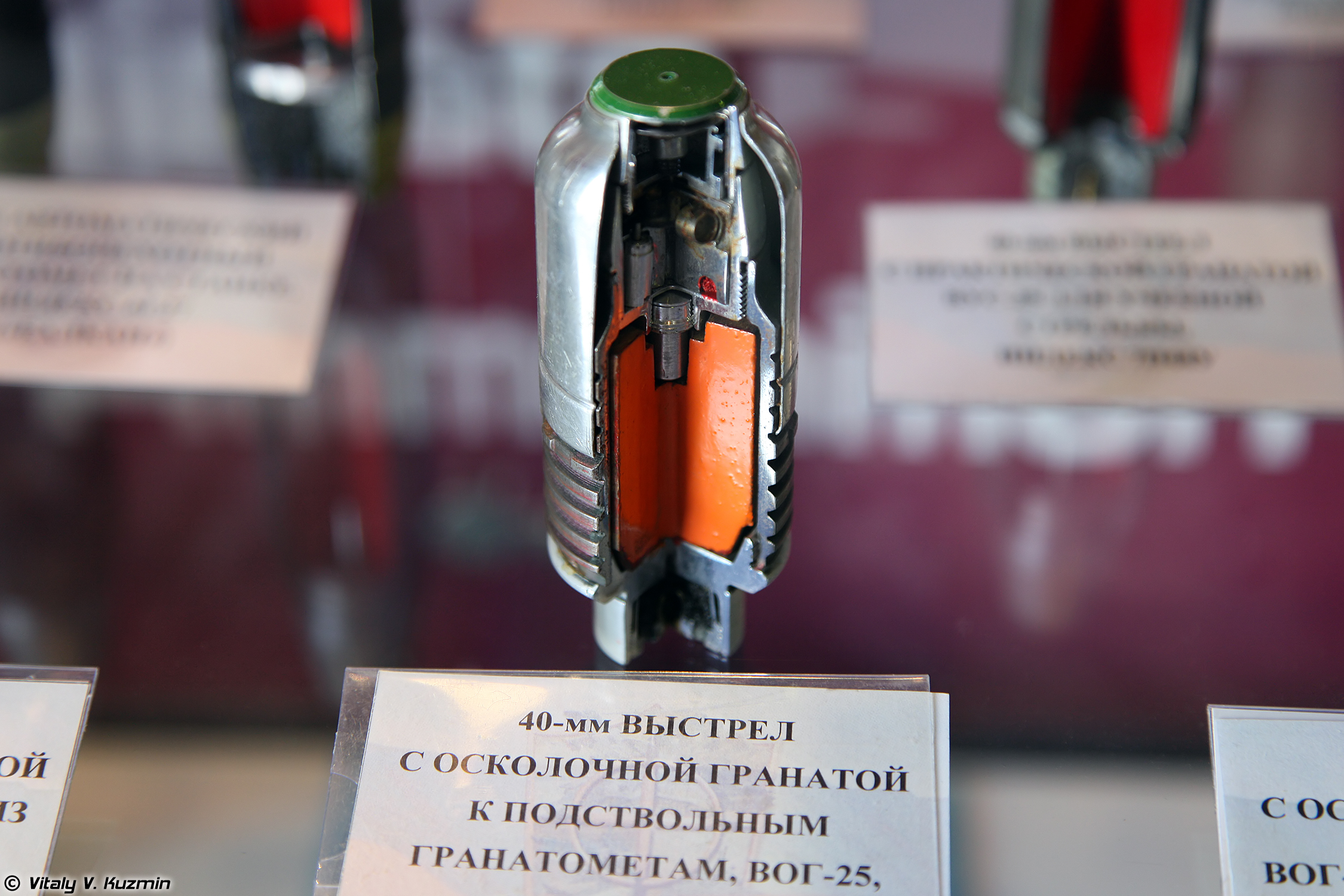
VOG-25

40 mm VOG-25 (Russian Cyrillic: ВОГ-25) (GRAU-Index: 7P17 (Russian Cyrillic: 7П17)) is a unique type of 40 mm grenade designed in the Soviet Union for hand-held grenade launchers, such as the Soviet GP-25 Kostyor and GP-30 Obuvka. Instead of a casing, the VOG-25 is caseless ammunition, featuring its propellant in an expansion chamber at the base of the projectile, functioning more like a mortar round than conventional cased ammunition.

Today it is used primarily by the Russian Armed Forces in weapons such as the GP-34, BG-15 Mukha and RG-6. Several types exist, but the most common version is the default VOG-25 high-explosive version.

The VOG-25 is 103 mm (4.1 in) long, weighs 250 g (8.8 oz), and features a 48 g (1.7 oz) explosive charge. It has a muzzle velocity of 76 m/s (250 ft/s) and will self-destruct after 14 seconds.

=== 40 mm Metal Storm (Australia) ===
Australia based R&D company Metal Storm Limited designed several automatic caseless 40 mm grenade launcher systems based on their own caseless ammunition weapon design prior to entering administration in 2012. Unlike common caseless ammunition and their weapon systems the Metal Storm design lacked a feeding magazine and instead used a superimposed load, stacking the projectiles in front of each other in the barrel with the propellant in between the projectiles. The system lacked moving parts and the propellant was electronically fired. The systems used the same warheads as existing 40mm grenades.

=== 40 mm 7P39 (Russia) ===
The 40mm 7P39 is a type of caseless grenade used in the Russian AGS-40 "Balkan" automatic grenade launcher. Unlike conventional grenades that use separate casings, propellants, and projectiles, the 7P39 integrates all components into a single unit, eliminating the need for ejected shell casings. This design is tailored for the AGS-40, which fires at up to 400 rounds per minute and has an effective range of approximately 2,500 meters. The 7P39 grenade features a high-explosive fragmentation (HE-FRAG) warhead and is approximately 132 mm in length, weighing around 0.432 kg. It is designed to deliver powerful explosive effects against personnel, vehicles, and fortifications. The 7P39 is not compatible with the VOG-25.

== See also ==
- 35 mm grenade
- 40×46mmSR Hellhound
- United States 40 mm grenades
