= Romak =

Romak may refer to:

- Jamie Romak, Canadian former professional baseball player
- Models of Romanian weapons:
  - PSL (rifle), Romanian rifle
  - Pușcă Automată model 1986, Romanian assault rifle
- Major Romak, fictional character in Starcom: The U.S. Space Force
