= Aruncător de grenade 40 mm =

Aruncător de grenade 40 mm (AG-40)
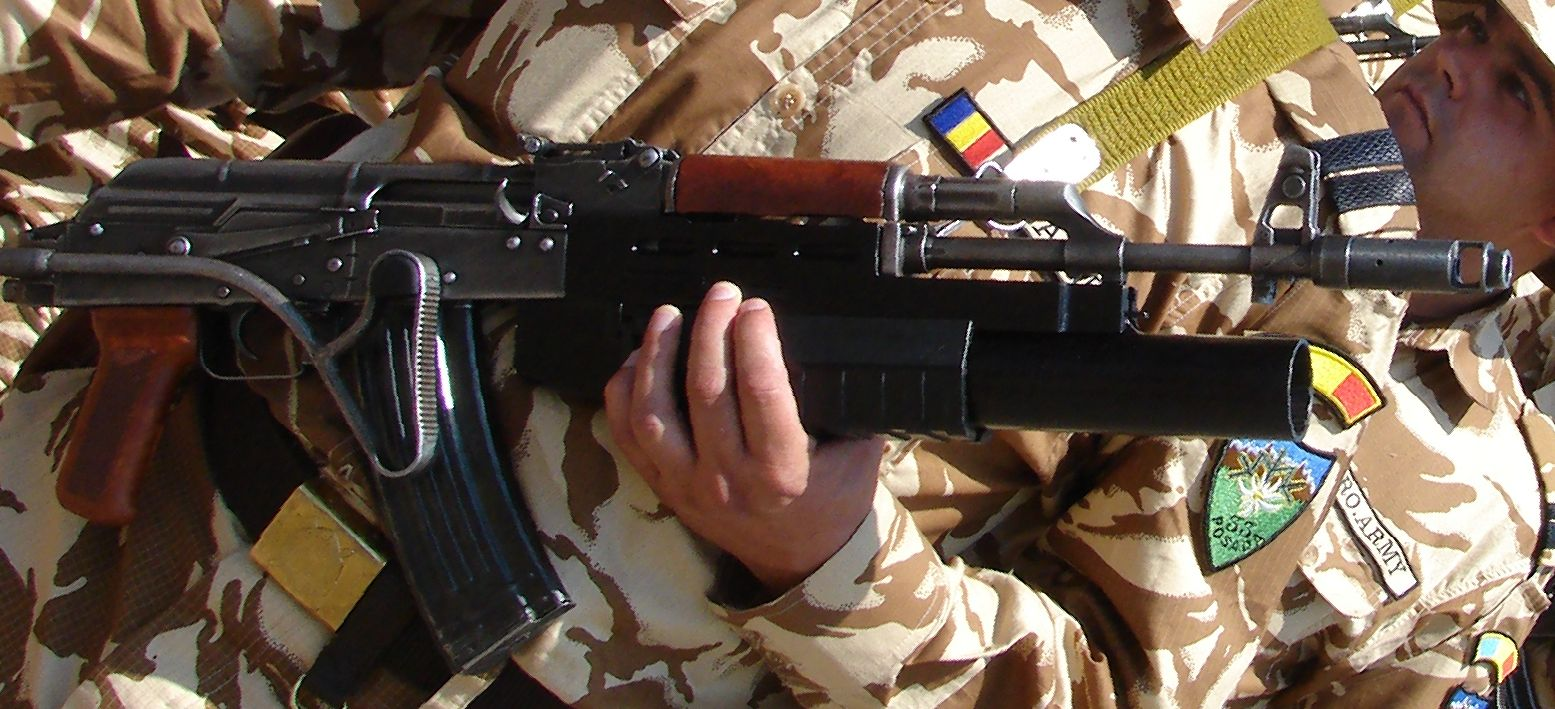
- The AG-40 mounted on a PA md. 86
- Type: Grenade launcher
- Place of origin: Romania

Service history
- Used by: See § Users
- Wars: Peacekeeping missions in Iraq and Afghanistan.

Specifications
- Length: 400 mm 400 millimetres (16 in)
- Barrel length: 300 mm 300 millimetres (12 in)
- Cartridge: 40×47mm
- Action: Break action
- Effective firing range: 400 m
- Feed system: Breech-loaded, single-shot
- Sights: Notched short range quadrant sight, graduated folding leaf sight

The Aruncător de grenade 40 mm (AG-40) is a rifle-mounted 40 mm grenade launcher. It is mounted as a lower handguard for a Kalashnikov pattern rifle. The AG-40 is currently used on the 5.45mm PA md. 86 standard assault rifle, in Romanian service. It replaced the older GP-25 Soviet-pattern grenade launcher.

== Technical data ==
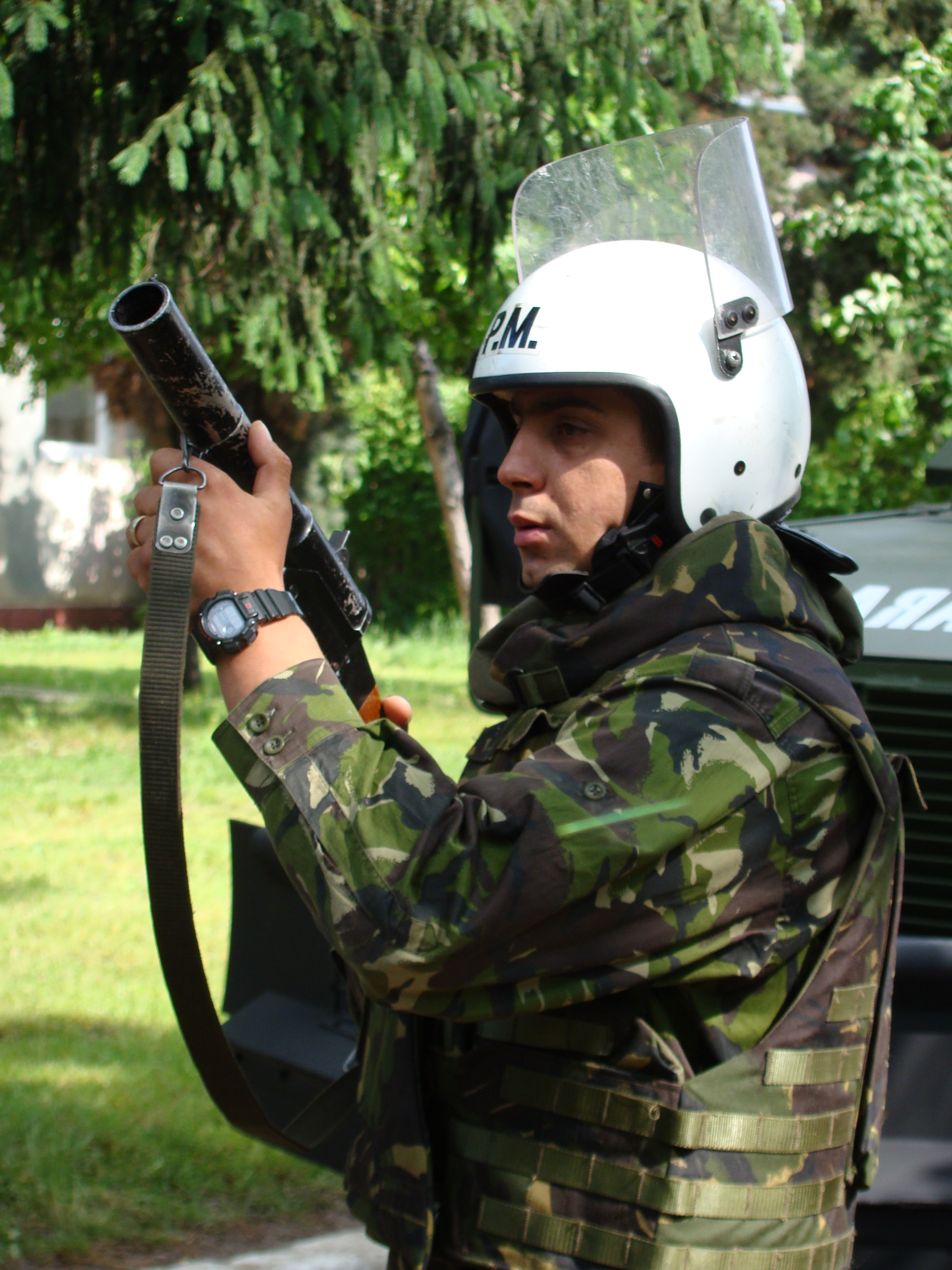
Romanian Military Police soldier with an AL-38 grenade launcher.

The AG-40 grenade launcher is manufactured by ROMARM and has the following technical specifications:

Model	AG-40P	AG-40PN	AL-38
Caliber	40 mm		38 mm
Cartridge	40 x 47 mm	40 x 46 mm	-
Operation	single shot
Feed	breech loading, sliding barrel		breech loading
Sight	fore, post; rear, aperture calibrated from 50 to 450 m		fore, post; rear, U-notch
Muzzle velocity	80 m/s	74 m/s	-
Minimum range	50 m		-
Barrel	16 grooves rh, 1 turn in 1,200 mm	6 grooves rh, 1 turn in 1,200 mm	strip
Weapon length	400 mm		700 mm
Barrel length	300 mm		350 mm
Line of sight	125 mm		320 mm
Weight	1.300 kg 1.3 kg (2.9 lb)		2.400 kg 2.4 kg (5.3 lb)

== Users ==
- Romania: Used by Infantry, Mountain Hunters, and Combat Divers.
- Georgia: Locally produced.
- Palestine

== Variants ==
- AG-40P - basic model (40x47 mm cartridge)
- AG-40PN - uses the 40x46 mm NATO cartridge
- AL-38 - anti-riot launcher version (38 mm caliber)
