= Pak 57 =

Pak 57 Anti Tank gun
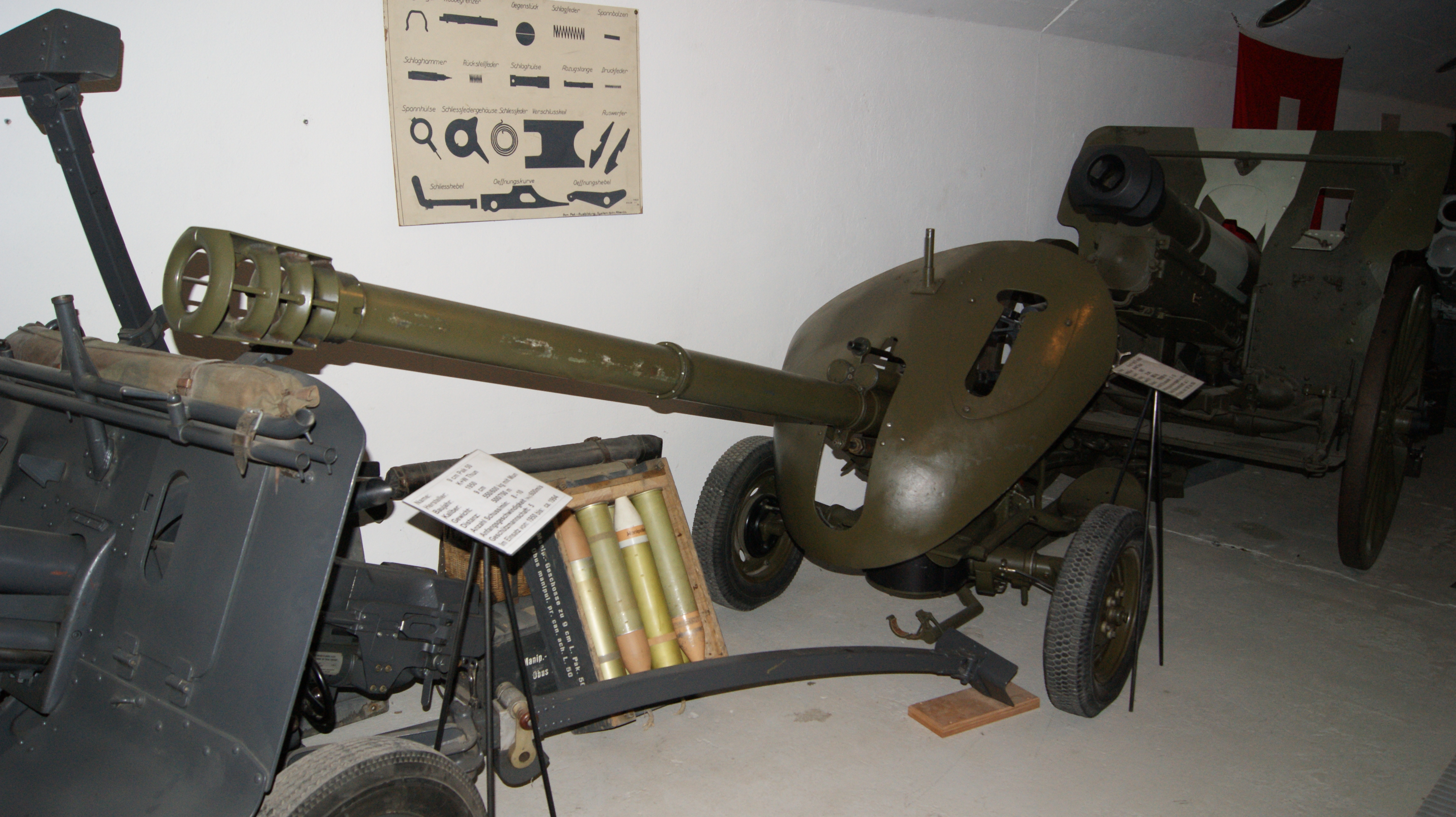
- Pak 57
- Type: Anti-tank gun
- Place of origin: Switzerland

Service history
- Used by: Switzerland
- Wars: none

Production history
- Designed: 1940s

Specifications
- Mass: 716 kg (1,579 lb)
- Crew: 3-4
- Cartridge: Fixed HEAT 3.15 kg (6 lb 15 oz)
- Caliber: 90 mm (3.5 in)
- Rate of fire: 10 rounds per minute
- Muzzle velocity: 600 m/s (2,000 ft/s)
- Effective firing range: 300 m (330 yd)
- Maximum firing range: 1,000 m (1,100 yd)

The Pak 57 was a Swiss 90 mm anti-tank gun used by the Swiss army.

== Development ==
After the Second World War, Switzerland sought to retrofit its armed forces. Their anti tank guns at the time were mostly older German 75mm guns that were not sufficient for their needs. The Pak 57 and Pak 50 designs were the first domestic designs intended to replace them. The Pak 57, though slightly heavier than the Pak 50, had a very short barrel for an anti-tank gun and was much lighter than foreign designs such as the 90 mm Gun M1/M2/M3. The HEAT round could penetrate 250 mm (9.8 in) of armor at 1 km (0.62 mi).

Both the Pak 50 and Pak 57 served with the Swiss fusilier battalions.
