= 8 cm PAW 600 =

8 cm Panzerabwehrwerfer 600
- PAW 600 at Aberdeen military proving grounds
- Type: Anti-tank gun
- Place of origin: Nazi Germany

Service history
- Used by: Nazi Germany
- Wars: World War II

Production history
- Designer: Rheinmetall
- Designed: 1943–1944
- Produced: December 1944–March 1945
- No. built: 260

Specifications
- Mass: Combat: 640 kg (1,410 lb)
- Barrel length: 2.95 m (9 ft 8 in)
- Crew: 6
- Caliber: 81.4 mm (3.20 in)
- Breech: vertical sliding-block
- Recoil: Hydro-pneumatic
- Carriage: Split trail
- Elevation: -6° to +32°
- Traverse: 55°
- Muzzle velocity: 520 m/s (1,706 ft/s)
- Effective firing range: 750 m (820 yd) (anti-tank)
- Maximum firing range: 6,200 m (6,800 yd) (high explosive)

The PAW 600 (Panzerabwehrwerfer 600, officially designated 8H63) was a lightweight anti-tank gun that used the high-low pressure system to fire hollow charge warheads. In 1945, it was used operationally by the Wehrmacht in small numbers. Only about 260 were produced before the war's end.

== Background ==
By 1943, the German army was faced with various problems concerning their existing anti-tank gun designs. They had started the war with the 3.7 cm PaK 36, which had the advantage of being very light at 328 kg, so that it could be moved a reasonable distance by hand using only its own crew. By 1941, this gun was inadequate; it could not deal with the heaviest armoured Soviet and British tanks. Its replacement, the 5 cm PaK 38, offered better performance (though still only marginal against the new threat) but, at 1,000 kg, was at the absolute limit of what the gun's own crew could effectively move into and out of a firing position by hand. The next gun, the 7.5 cm PaK 40, was a very effective tank-killer; but, at 1,425 kg, was no longer suitable for use by the infantry. A much larger crew and a vehicle was required to move this gun any distance at all and often just to displace it out of its firing position. Many were lost intact simply because they were overrun before their crews could move them. As the guns got bigger to deal with the latest tank technology, they became too heavy for tactical employment and more expensive. The PAK 36 cost RM 5,730 and took 900 work-hours to build, while a PAK 40 cost RM 12,000 and took 2,000 work-hours to build. The situation was so bad that, by May 1944, the 14th (Panzerjager) Kompanie of infantry regiments were having their heavy anti-tank guns removed and replaced by the Panzerschreck rocket launcher. But with an effective range of only 150 meters, this weapon did not provide the depth of fire required for the regiment's anti-tank defense. The only other alternative for a light anti-tank gun had been a recoilless weapon, but the German Army was less than enthusiastic because this type of weapon had many shortcomings, particularly its high demand for propellant.

== Design and development ==
In 1943, a specification was issued for a lightweight anti-tank gun that used less propellant than a rocket or recoilless weapon, yet was sufficiently accurate to hit a 1-meter square target at a range of 750 meters. Rheinmetall-Borsig proposed a design to meet this requirement using the new high-low pressure ballistic principle, also known as the Hoch-Niederdruck system. In this system, high pressure caused by the combustion of the propellant was confined to the breech section, which was relatively heavy, and did not act directly on the projectile. The pressure was allowed to bleed gradually into the barrel at a controlled rate and lower pressure to propel the projectile. Thus the barrel could be exceptionally light for a weapon that still had the advantages that accrue from a high pressure gun. The carriage too could be very light, although the initial prototype carriages proved to be too light and had to be redesigned. The resulting PAW 600 (later redesignated 8H63) gun weighed about 600 kg, less than half that of the 7.5 cm PaK 40, while having comparable armor penetration out to its full effective anti-tank range of 750 meters.

Unlike previous anti-tank guns, which relied on firing steel projectiles at high velocities to penetrate heavy armor, the 8H63 was designed to fire shaped charge ammunition (also called hollow-charge ammunition, high explosive anti-tank, or HEAT). Because shaped charge warheads perform best when no spin is imparted on the projectile, the 8H63 was a smoothbore design. To simplify development and manufacture, the projectiles used were based on the widely used 8 cm Granatwerfer 34 mortar (actual caliber 81.4 mm). This allowed the use of existing tooling in the manufacture of the ammunition, which reduced the costs. The cartridge case was developed from the 10.5 cm leFH 18 howitzer.

The standard shaped charge projectile, which was designated 8 cm W Gr Patr H1 4462, weighed 2.70 kg. The propelling charge was 360 g of Digl B1 P (compared to a 500 g propelling charge for a Gr 38 Hl/B fired from a PAK 40), which produced a muzzle velocity of 520 mps and provided an effective range of 750 meters against a 1m² target. Armor penetration was 140mm of vertical armor, which was comparable to the 7.5 cm PAK 40 firing the rare and expensive tungsten-cored PzGr40 shot.

=== Other uses and rounds ===
Because the ammunition was developed from the standard infantry mortar, any type of round developed for the mortar could have been readily adapted for the 8H63, including high-explosive (HE), smoke and illuminating rounds. The HE round, the 8 cm W Gr Patr 5071 with a 4.46 kg projectile and total round weight of 8.30 kg was developed. This could employ three different charge increments for maximum ranges of 3,400 meters @ 220 mps, 5,600 meters @ 320 mps or 6,200 meters at 420 mps - about three times the range of the mortar and with the possibility of direct or indirect fire. This performance brings up another interesting feature of this gun. Traditional high-velocity anti-tank guns were very inefficient when employed as field artillery firing explosive rounds in support of the infantry. The thick projectile walls necessary to withstand high velocities ensured a small explosive payload and the amount of propellent used was wasteful. The guns also fired at low trajectories (+22 degrees for a PAK 40), which limited their utility. For this reason, the German Army had always employed Infantry Guns, such as the 7.5 cm leichtes Infanteriegeschütz 18, at the regimental level to provide fire support under the direct and immediate control of the infantry. This meant that every infantry regiment had an infantry gun company for use against unarmored targets and a tank destroyer (anti-tank gun) company for use against armored targets. A 8H63 firing an explosive round had a lethality almost comparable to the 7.5 cm infantry gun and had a greater range. The 8H63's multi-charge cartridge, 55 degree traverse (fine for anti-tank defence) and +32 degree maximum elevation could have allowed the merger of the infantry and anti-tank gun categories with resulting savings in production, logistics, and precious manpower. The 8H63 was to be organized under the new 1945 Table of Organization and Equipment (TO&E) in anti-tank companies of 12 guns with 104 men, replacing the anti-tank and infantry gun companies (300+ men) of previous organizations.

== Production ==
Some 260 guns and 34,800 rounds of ammunition were completed from December 1944, with 81 guns delivered to the troops in January 1945 and 155 listed on 1 March 1945. Plans had called for the production of 1,000 guns, 4,000,000 anti-tank and 800,000 explosive shells per month. Production models were fitted with PAK 40 muzzle brakes and had either the purpose-built light carriage or used redundant PAK 38 carriages, which were slightly heavier.

== Further development perspectives ==
Several self-propelled models were proposed in 1945, but the war ended before even prototypes could be built. It is clear that, had the war in Europe carried on longer, the 8H63 would have been a major factor and would likely have complemented the towed PAK 40 and replaced various 7.5 cm infantry guns in production.

Krupp was also developing an enlarged 10 cm design, known as the 10 cm PAW 1000 or 10H64, towards the end of the war, but it didn't reach the production stage. This would have had an armor penetration increased to 200 mm, with the effective range against tanks increased to 1,000 meters all in a gun weighing about 1,000 kg.

== Use in combat ==
The weapon was used near the River Aller on 14 April 1945, as described in the following account by the official history of 15th/19th The King's Royal Hussars by Major G Courage 15/19H, who was with the regiment on the day.

"The enemy resistance had been determined and tough, only equalled by that met in the Rhineland fighting. The Marines had used their SA weapons and bazookas with skill and they had been well backed up by the large number of guns sited in support of them. Their 88-mm guns were well sited and difficult to spot in the thick country which was admirably suited to defence. The one which had given the most trouble was afterwards found to be well dug in and almost impossible of detection from the A or C Squadron positions. We found too that the first guns which had been met were 75-mm bored out to 80-mm and firing a hollow charge projectile through a smooth bore.

This was a new weapon and, although it was not thought to be effective over about five hundred yards, it was an interesting example of German improvisation."

== Nomenclature ==
The Panzerabwehrwerfer 600 ("anti-tank thrower") designation was used by Rheinmetall during the design phase. The service designation was 8H63 in accordance to the new designation system used during the last year of the war.

In 1944–5, the Germans changed their system of artillery designations from the old "year" system. Each weapon was to have a number showing their caliber group, a letter denoting the ammunition group, and the last two digits were from the weapon drawing number. In this case, 8H denoted an 81.4 mm caliber weapon using the H group of ammunition. The shells were all to be designated as H with a four digit number, the first three were the drawing number and the last was the shell's category from the following list:

#	Shell type	#	Shell type
1	high explosive	6	gas
2	hollow charge anti-tank	7	incendiary
3	armor-piercing	8	leaflet
4	high explosive, high capacity	9	practice
5	smoke	10	proof projectile

PAW 600

== In museums ==
Coastal Defence Museum in Świnoujście (Poland) - one of three remaining PAW 600 in the world. Aberdeen Proving ground in Maryland, USA.
