= High–low system =

Design of cannon and anti-tank launcher

The high–low system (or high–low pressure system, high–low propulsion system, high–low projection system) is a design of cannon and anti-tank warfare launcher using a smaller high-pressure chamber to store propellant. It allows a much larger projectile to be launched without the heavy equipment usually needed for large caliber weapons. When the propellant is ignited, the higher pressure gases are bled out through vents (or ports) at reduced pressure to a much larger low pressure chamber to push a projectile forward. The high-low system allows the weight of the weapon and its ammunition to be reduced significantly. Production cost and time are drastically lower than for standard cannon or other small-arm weapon systems firing a projectile of the same size and weight. It has a far more efficient use of the propellant, unlike earlier recoilless weapons, where most of the propellant is expended to the rear of the weapon to counter the recoil of the projectile being fired.

== Origin ==
In the final years of World War II, Nazi Germany researched and developed low-cost anti-tank weapons. Large anti-tank cannon firing high velocity projectiles were the best option, but costly to produce and required a well trained crew. They also lacked mobility on the battlefield once emplaced. Anti-tank rocket launchers and recoilless rifles, while much lighter and simpler to manufacture, gave the gunner's position away and were not as accurate as anti-tank cannons. Recoilless rifles used a huge amount of propellant to fire the projectile, with estimates ranging from only one-fifth to one-ninth of the propellant gases being used to push the projectile forward. (Note: With the simple one-man Panzerfaust the ratio was even higher.) The German military asked for an anti-tank weapon with performance in-between that of the standard high velocity cannon and the cheaper rocket and recoilless infantry anti-tank weapons. They also stipulated that any solution had to be more efficient in the use of propellant, as the German war industry had reached maximum cannon propellant production capacity.

In 1944, the German firm Rheinmetall–Borsig came up with a completely new concept for propelling a projectile from a cannon, which, while not recoilless, greatly diminished recoil and drastically reduced the manufacturing cost. This concept was called the "Hoch-und-Niederdruck System" which translates to "high and low-pressure system". With this system, only the very back of the cannon's breech had to be reinforced against high firing pressures.

Rheinmetall designed an anti-tank cannon using their "high-low pressure system" that fired a standard general-purpose high explosive (HE) 8.1-cm mortar bomb which had been modified to function as an anti-tank round with a shaped charge. Such charges are now commonly called high-explosive anti-tank (HEAT) warheads or projectiles. Unlike high-velocity armour piercing ammunition, which has a heavy steel case, the shaped charge had only thin metal wall, reducing the weight of the shell body and increasing the explosive payload. A round steel plate with eight holes in it was fitted at the mouth of a cut-down cannon shell casing which contained two propellant bags. A rod attached the 2.7kg round to the plate with a shear pin. On firing, the initial pressure (which had to be quite high in order to reliably and effectively burn the propellant) would be contained in the shell casing, which along with the reinforced breech acted as the "high pressure chamber". Propellant gases would then bled out the holes in the steel plate into the space between the round and the plate, which acted as the "low pressure chamber" until pressure built to the point that the shear pin broke, releasing the projectile. Unlike standard cannons, in which the propellant accelerates a projectile out a barrel with a very high, almost instant force, to maximum muzzle velocity, the Rheinmetall concept pushes a projectile out a barrel at a slower muzzle velocity. As a shaped charge was used, no need exists for the high velocities of conventional anti-tank guns, and the muzzle velocity was comparatively low at 540m/s. There is still recoil, but the combination of lighter projectile, lower velocity, and a different acceleration profile meant that there was nowhere near the recoil of the 5-cm and 7.5-cm anti-tank cannons being used then by German forces, which required heavy constructed carriages, both heavy and complex hydraulic recoil-mechanisms, and muzzle brakes to contain the great recoil on firing. The Rheinmetall solution required only a lightweight recoil-unit and muzzle brake.

The 81 mm weapon weighed significantly less than even the obsolete 50 mm cannon and Allied 57 mm guns, less than a seventh of the weight of the 88 mm Pak it was to supplement, and less than a tenth of the weight of the famous 88 mm anti-aircraft gun turned anti-tank weapon.

The only major drawback was its maximum range of 750 meters (in direct fire against tanks), but this was offset by an armor penetration of 140 mm and no telltale back-blast. At over 500 meters, this was superior to both the German long barrel 75 mm cannon, and the American 76 mm gun, even when the latter was equipped with tungsten high velocity armor-piercing rounds. The Germans ordered the Rheinmetall gun into production, designating it as the 8-cm Panzer Abwehr Werfer 600 (PAW 600). (Note: In the last months of the war, the German Army re-designated it the Panzerwurfkanone 8H63 (PWK 8H63).) Only about 250 were produced before the war's end. Few were reported to have seen combat (in one British regimental history, see the PAW600 wiki article).

The high-low system developed on the PAW 600 was later used to propel the shells for the ubiquitous American 40 mm grenade launcher.

== Further development ==
The Allies captured and examined the PWK, but initially showed little interest in the new system developed by the Germans. The first example of a type of high-low system developed after World War II was the British Limbo antisubmarine weapon, which launched depth charge-like projectiles. The Limbo was a development of the World War II Squid, which, while effective, was limited by a set range of 275 meters. The Limbo, by opening and closing vents that varied the pressure of the gases on firing, allowed for a range that could be varied between 336 meters to almost 1000 meters.

Another example was the system developed by the Canadian Armament Research and Development Establishment (CARDE) in the early 1950s to conduct supersonic flight tests on models of the Velvet Glove air-to-air missile.

== M79 40-mm grenade launcher ==
Cross Section of a 40 mm HEDP round

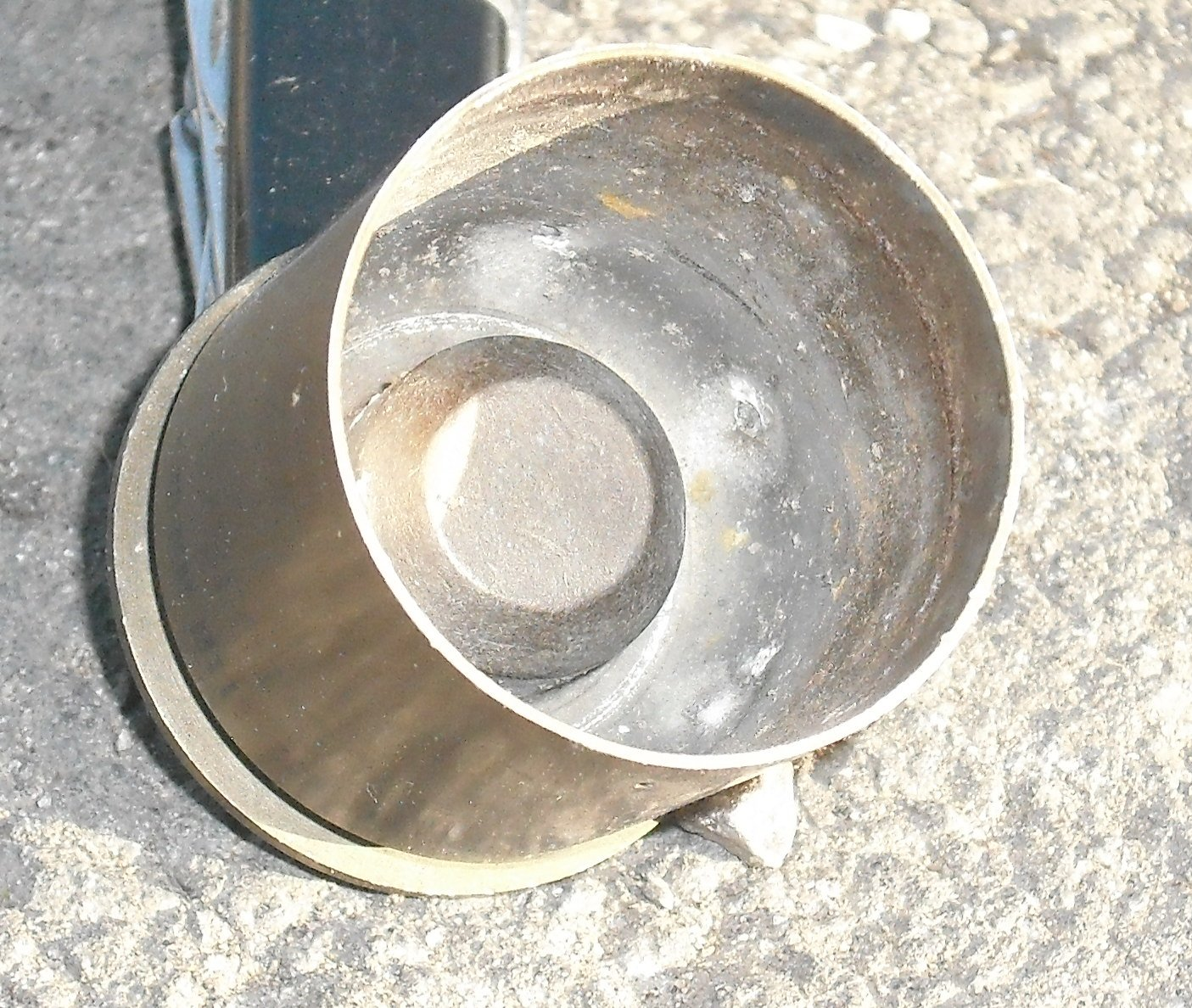
Inside view of a spent casing for a 40 mm grenade, showing the internal pressure chamber for the high-low pressure system (design different from picture to the left)

The most well known use of the high-low system was by the U.S. Army, with the introduction of the M79 grenade launcher, shortly before the Vietnam War. The M79 fired a 40 mm shell which contained a standard fragmentation grenade with a modified fuze. The cartridge casing contains a heavy cup-shaped "high pressure chamber" in the bottom. On firing, the propellant builds up pressure until it breaks through the copper cover, venting out to the "low pressure chamber". The U.S. Army referred to their high-low system as the "high-low propulsion system". Along with a heavy rubber pad on the M79 butt stock, the high-low system kept recoil forces manageable for infantry using the weapon.

The M79 was later replaced by the M203, which mounts under the barrel of a rifle. Later, the U.S. Army developed a higher-velocity 40 mm round using their high-low propulsion system for use by heavier machine gun-type grenade launchers found on vehicles and helicopters. Today, besides the U.S. military, the 40 mm grenade family is extremely popular and in use by armies worldwide and variants of it are in production by countries other than the U.S., with one reputable reference publication in 1994 needing almost a dozen pages to list all the variants and nations producing 40-mm grenade ammunition based on the U.S. Army's development of the 1960s.

== Soviet developments ==
Shortly after the Vietnam War ended, the Soviet Union introduced a 40 mm grenade launcher that used the high-low principle, but with a twist on the original design. The GP-25 40 mm grenade launcher fits under the assault rifle and fires a caseless projectile that is muzzle-loaded. Instead of having a case, the high-pressure chamber is located on the rear of the projectile with ten vent holes, in which the launcher barrel acts as the low-pressure chamber. The ignition of the propellant gases also causes the drive band to engage the launcher grooves, similar to the American Civil War Parrott rifle muzzle loading rifled cannon.

While little documentation exists, in the 1950s the Soviet Army developed a 73 mm cannon for wheeled armored reconnaissance vehicles that fired a munition very similar in operation to the original World War II German concept. However, it was never introduced into service, and instead the Soviets developed a 2A28 Grom low velocity 73 mm cannon that fired a rocket projectile which was ejected by a small charge in the normal fashion.

== Swedish use ==
External images
- Pansarskott m/68 "Miniman"
- Pskott m/68 from Swedish Army manual
- Miniman high-low launch system located behind 74mm HEAT projectile

The only other major use of a high-low system was by the Swedish firm FFV in their development of the 1960s-era Miniman one man infantry antitank weapon. The Miniman was simpler and cheaper than anything imagined by designers in World War II. Inside what looked like a rocket launcher tube, is a high-explosive anti-tank (HEAT) projectile attached by a break-away bolt to an alloy aluminum tube with ports drilled in it and which acts like a kind of high-pressure chamber. The launch tube in which it is mounted acts as the low-pressure chamber. When the propellant is ignited in the aluminum tube, gases escape through the ports and are allowed to build up in the launch tube to the point of almost causing a recoil. The break-away bolt then snaps, allowing the projectile to move forward. Unlike other high-low systems, gases are allowed to escape to the rear of the launch tube, causing a fully recoilless effect.
