= Net explosive quantity =

The net explosive quantity (NEQ), also known as net explosive content (NEC) or net explosive weight (NEW), of a shipment of munitions, fireworks or similar products is the total mass of the contained explosive substances, without the packaging, casings, bullets etc. It also includes the mass of the TNT-equivalent of all contained energetic substances.

The NEQ is often stated on shipment containers for safety purposes.

== See also ==
- TNT equivalent
