= Anti-tank gun =

Form of artillery

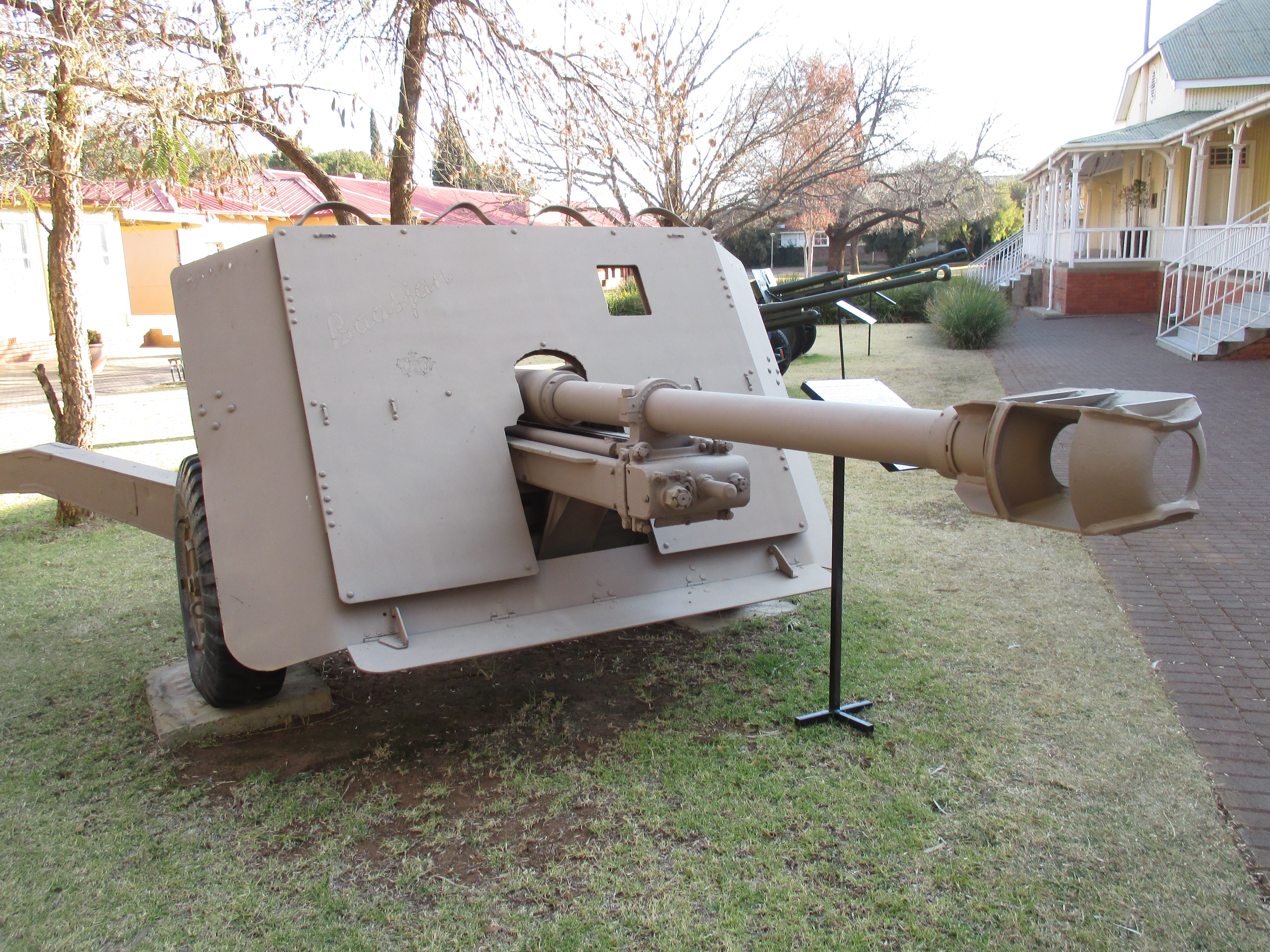
French-designed DEFA D921/GT-2 90 mm towed anti-tank gun as mounted on a QF 17-pounder carriage

An anti-tank gun is a form of artillery designed to destroy tanks and other armored fighting vehicles, normally from a static defensive position. The development of specialized anti-tank munitions and anti-tank guns was prompted by the appearance of tanks during World War I. To destroy hostile tanks, artillerymen often used field guns depressed to fire directly at their targets, but this practice expended too much valuable ammunition and was of increasingly limited effectiveness as tank armor became thicker. The first dedicated anti-tank artillery began appearing in the 1920s, and by World War II was a common appearance in many European armies. To penetrate armor, they fired specialized ammunition from longer barrels to achieve a higher muzzle velocity than field guns. Most anti-tank guns were developed in the 1930s as improvements in tanks were noted, and nearly every major arms manufacturer produced one type or another.

Anti-tank guns deployed during World War II were often manned by specialist infantry rather than artillery crews, and issued to light infantry units accordingly. The anti-tank guns of the 1920s and 1930s were of small caliber; nearly all major armies possessing them used 37 mm ammunition (the British Army used the slightly larger 40 mm 2-pounder gun). As World War II progressed, the appearance of heavier tanks rendered these weapons obsolete, and anti-tank guns likewise began firing larger and more effective armor-piercing shots. The development of the compact hollow charge projectile permanently altered anti-tank warfare, since this type of ammunition did not depend on a high muzzle velocity and could be fired from low-recoil, man-portable light weapons, such as the Panzerfaust and the American series of recoilless rifles.

Although several large-caliber guns were developed during the war that could knock out the most heavily armored tanks, they proved expensive and difficult to conceal. The later generation of low-recoil anti-tank weapons, which allowed projectiles the size of an artillery shell to be fired from the shoulder, was considered a far more viable option for arming infantry. Recoilless rifles replaced most conventional anti-tank guns in the postwar period; nevertheless, the development of new anti-tank guns exhibiting similar low-recoil performance continued until the late 1950s in France, Belgium, and the Soviet Union. A few Soviet designs saw combat well into the 1980s and 1990s.

== History ==
=== World War I and Interwar period ===
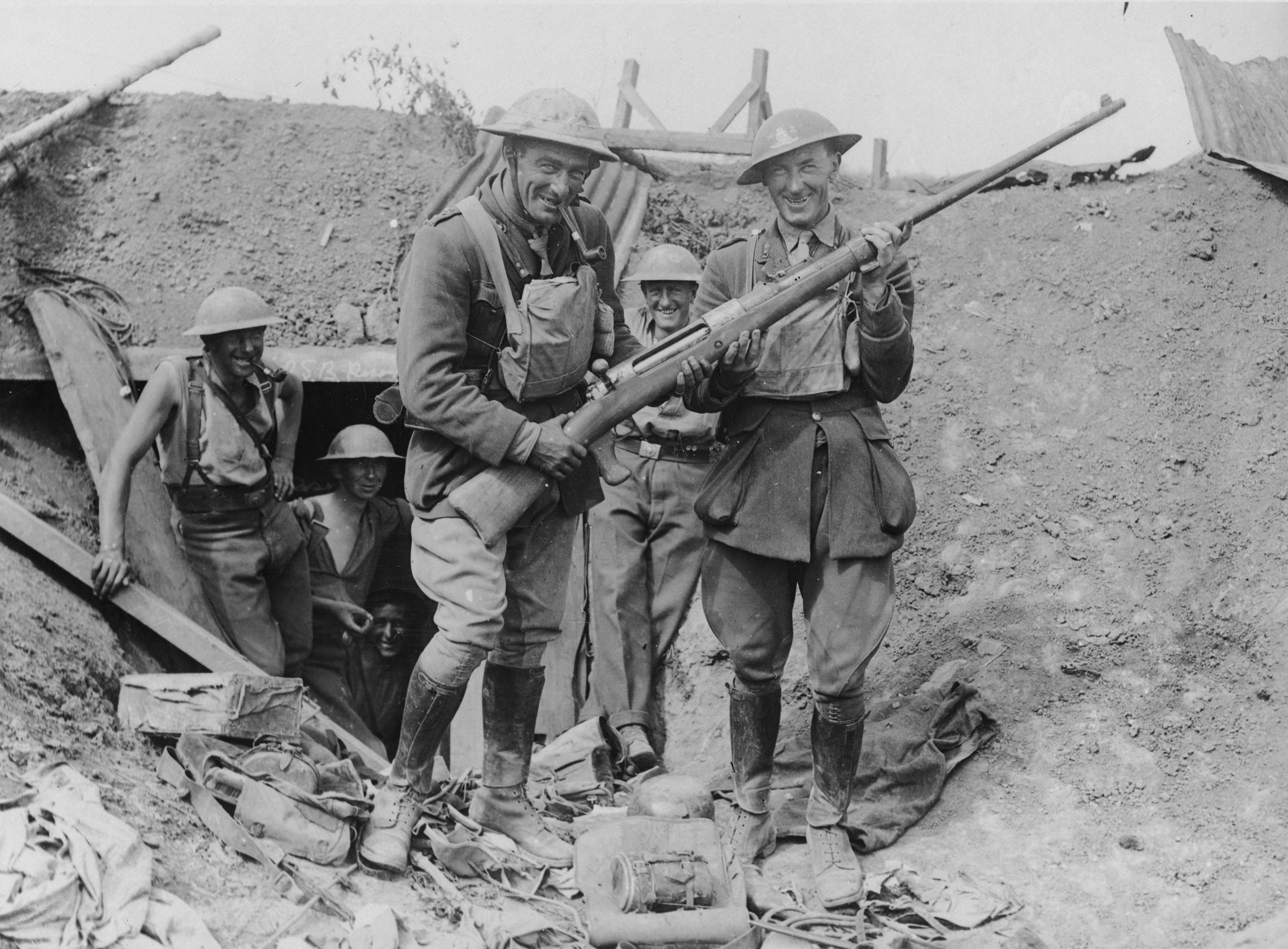
Two British officers with a captured Mauser 1918 T-Gewehr

The first specialized anti-tank weaponry consisted of anti-tank rifles. These emerged from the mixed results of deploying field artillery against tanks during World War I, and the need to produce a more economical weapon to destroy them. Most anti-tank rifles were over 1.3 m (4 ft 3 in) in length, however, and difficult for soldiers to operate in the confines of their trenches. They could penetrate a tank's armor at long range, but without explosive firepower, often failed to cause catastrophic damage, kill, or even seriously injure the crew, or disable the tank. Many infantry support guns designed to defeat hard targets such as fortified machine gun emplacements were used as makeshift anti-tank weapons, including the French Canon d'Infanterie de 37 modèle 1916 TRP. The 3.7 cm Tankabwehrkanone 1918 im starrer Räder–lafette was probably the first dedicated anti-tank gun in service. However, its gun barrel was based on an earlier Hotchkiss 5-barrelled rotary-cannon. The 3.7 cm TAK 1918 was designed and built for the Imperial German Army in 1918. The 3.7 cm Pak 36 which first appeared in 1928 was probably the first purpose-built anti-tank gun. Weighing some 160 kg (350 lb), the Pak 36 could inflict a catastrophic kill on a tank rather than merely penetrating its armor plate. Towed guns similar to the Pak 36 were the only anti-tank weapon issued to European armies during the 1930s, and several influential designs proliferated, such as the Böhler gun. By the late 1930s, anti-tank guns had been manufactured by companies in Germany, Austria, France, Czechoslovakia, Belgium, Great Britain, Denmark, and Sweden. A few countries, such as the Soviet Union, also manufactured foreign designs under license.

=== World War II ===
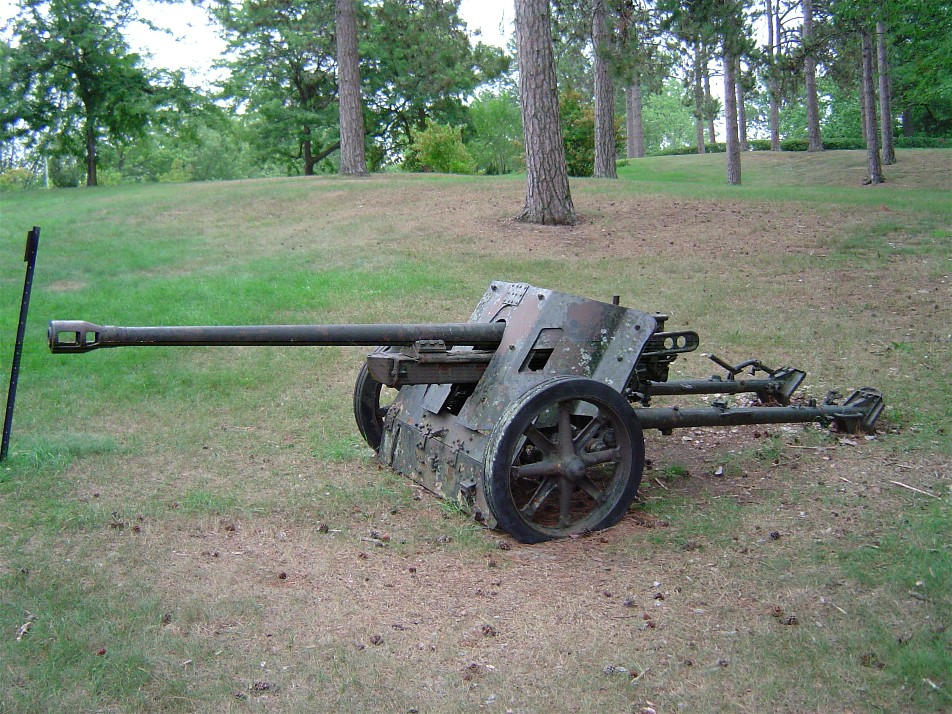
German PaK 38 50-mm anti-tank gun

At the outbreak of World War II, most armies were fielding light anti-tank guns firing 37 mm ammunition. The guns were usually mounted on two-wheeled carriages so they could be towed into position, then withdrawn and repositioned rapidly. Since they weighed only a few hundred pounds on average, they could also be shoved into position. All fired high-explosive and solid armor-piercing shot effective at ranges up to roughly 500 m (1,600 ft), and an increasing number were manufactured with protective gun shields in addition to a split rail mounting. They were able to destroy tanks fielded by both sides during the first two years of the war, but soon proved impotent against the heavier tank armor that debuted in 1940. French doctrine was for their infantry to let enemy tanks pass through, then stop the accompanying enemy infantry, leaving the unsupported tanks to be engaged by anti-tank guns deployed in three echelons. The issue of 58 guns per division provided 10 guns per kilometer of front, which was expected to be sufficient to deal with an enemy tank concentration of 50 tanks per kilometer. In practice, the German invasion of France concentrated tanks in select divisions at up to 100 per kilometer.

Introducing improved ammunition and increasing muzzle velocity initially helped compensate for their mediocre performance, but small-caliber anti-tank guns clearly would soon be overtaken by yet more heavily armored tanks. Medium-caliber guns in the 40- to 50-mm range began to appear, some of which used rebored 37-mm barrels. Although they, too, were soon approaching obsolescence, most remained in use with infantry units until the end of the war. Anti-tank guns remained ineffective against sloped armor, as demonstrated by an incident in 1941 when a single Soviet T-34 tank was hit more than 30 times by a battalion-sized contingent of German 37 and 50-mm anti-tank guns. The tank survived intact and was driven back to its own lines a few hours later. This helped earn the Pak 36 the moniker of Panzeranklopfgerät ("tank door knocker") because its crew revealed their presence and wasted their shells without damaging the T-34's armor. Anti-tank gunners began aiming at tank tracks, or vulnerable margins on the turret ring and gun mantlet, rather than testing their lighter cannon against bow and turret armor. These difficulties resulted in new types of ammunition being issued, namely high-explosive anti-tank (HEAT) and armor-piercing discarding sabot (APDS) projectiles.

Towards the end of World War II, armor plating became still thicker, with tanks such as the Tiger II being fitted with armor over 100 mm (3.9 in) in thickness, as compared to 15 mm (0.59 in), which was more typical in 1939. This prompted the development of a third generation of anti-tank guns, large-caliber pieces in the 57- to 100-mm range. The British Army adopted the Ordnance QF 6-pounder and Ordnance QF 17-pounder, which were then considered great advances in firepower, and the Wehrmacht fielded the even larger 7.5 cm Pak 41 and 8.8 cm Pak 43. While the early 37-mm anti-tank guns were easily concealed and moved, the large-caliber weapons available late in the war required equally large vehicles to tow them into place, and were difficult to conceal, dig in, withdraw, or reposition. By 1945, large anti-tank guns had become almost impractical in their role, and their size and weight were considered liabilities. They were also expensive to produce, and although they were capable of defeating the most formidable of opponents, most tank units still consisted of less heavily armored models that remained vulnerable to less expensive and more practical guns, as well. Many heavy anti-tank guns were issued, at least initially, on the divisional level, but gradually made their way to individual infantry battalions.

Meanwhile, the effect of very compact hollow charge warheads was being noted, and several countries began producing man-portable anti-tank weapons using this ammunition. The development of man-portable, shoulder-fired, anti-tank rocket launchers began in 1941; most could be reloaded, but a few, such as the German Panzerfaust, were fired from disposable tubes. Unlike anti-tank guns, their lightweight design made them easily portable by individual soldiers on the battlefield, and they offered comparable firepower whilst being quicker and cheaper to produce.

Towed anti-tank guns disappeared from most Western countries, such as the United States, after World War II, to be replaced by shoulder-fired rocket launchers, recoilless rifles, and eventually, guided anti-tank missiles.

=== Postwar period ===
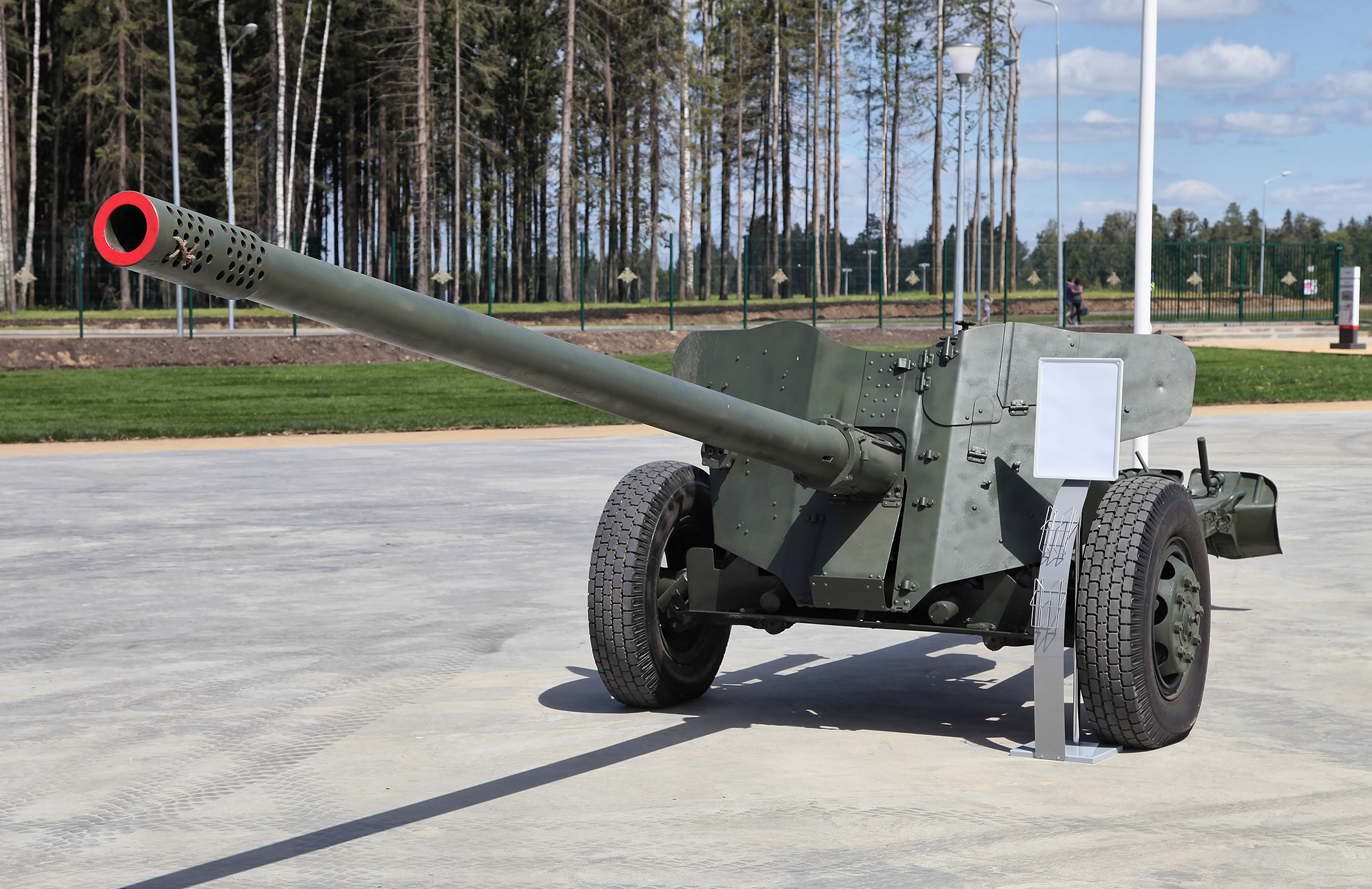
Postwar Soviet MT-12 100-mm anti-tank gun

At the end of the war, German engineers had proposed a new, large-caliber anti-tank gun that used less propellant than a rocket or a recoilless weapon, yet fired compact, hollow-charge shells similar to those used by the latter. German forces subsequently fielded the 8 cm PAW 600, which was an extremely lightweight, low-pressure weapon still able to fire the same ammunition types as higher-velocity anti-tank guns. In the 1950s, this idea was revived by a Belgian firm, Mecar, which subsequently improved on the concept and developed a low-pressure, smoothbore, 90-mm anti-tank gun. Because of its low recoil forces and light construction, the gun was particularly useful for being mounted on armored cars or small gun carriages. Its design inspired the lightly rifled French DEFA D921 anti-tank gun, which fired fin-stabilized shells and was available on a towed carriage or as a vehicle mount. It was later mated to the AML-90 and EBR series of French armored cars. The Soviet Union also adopted a similar design around the same time, the 100-mm T-12 anti-tank gun, which was smoothbore and fired fin-stabilized shells. Switzerland developed a postwar 90-mm anti-tank gun of its own, the Pak 50/57, firing shells with an even lower velocity than the Mecar or DEFA guns. Apart from the T-12, which used APDS rounds, these weapons could only use HEAT shells for armor-piercing purposes. France did introduce an APFSDS shell for the DEFA D921 at some point in the 1980s. The last country known to have produced a dedicated anti-tank gun was the People's Republic of China in 1988. The Chinese gun was known as the Norinco Type 86 and was probably manufactured as a replacement for the aging Soviet-sourced T-12.

Anti-tank guns continued to be used in many conflicts around the world, such as the Six-Day War and the South African Border War. Soviet anti-tank guns in particular were exported to at least 18 other countries after being retired from service, and have continued to see action.

== Self-propelled anti-tank guns ==
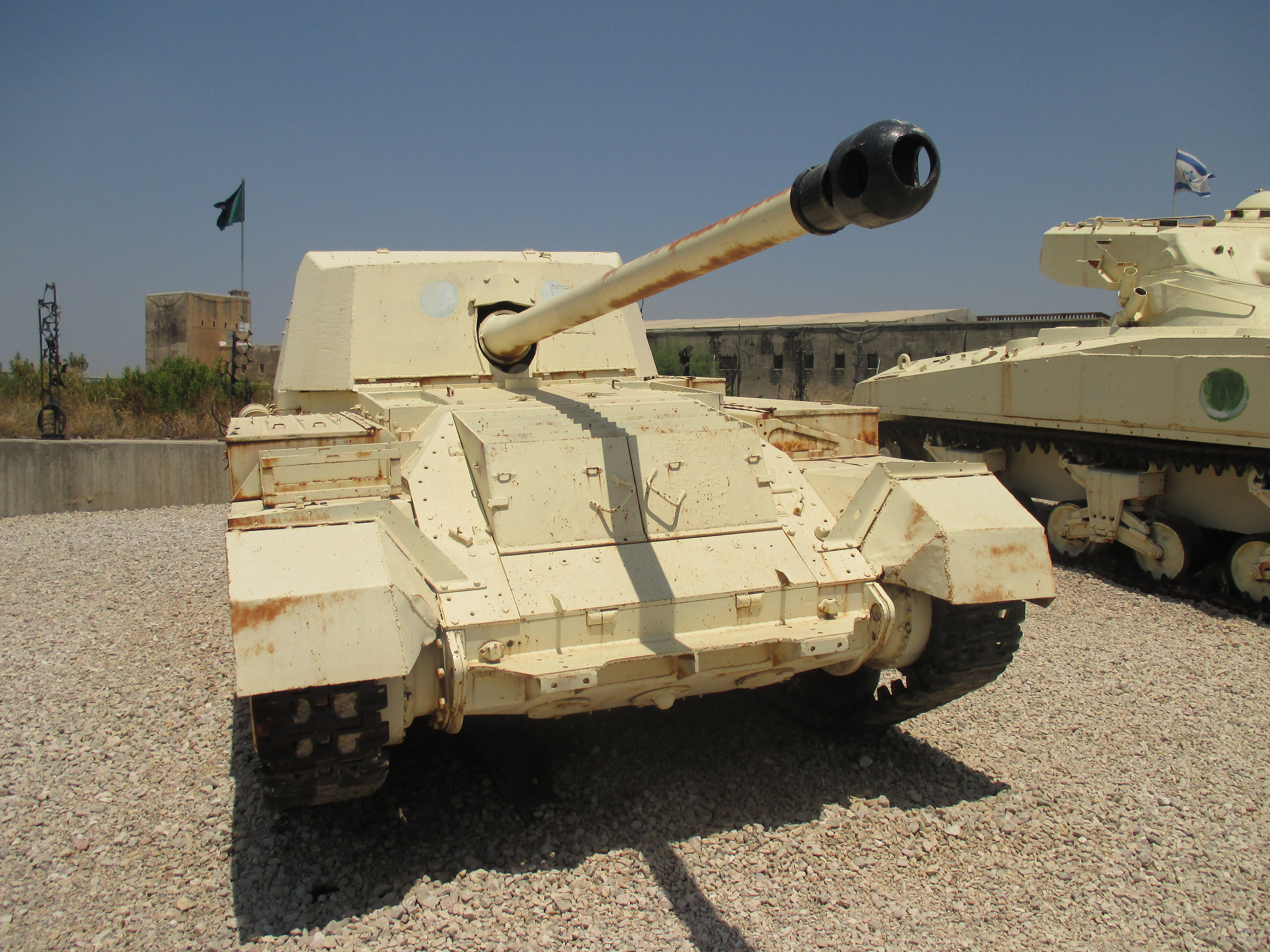
A British Archer tank destroyer, based on the hull of a Valentine tank.

Although still being drawn by horses or towed by trucks, towed anti-tank guns were initially much lighter and more portable than field guns, making them well-suited to infantry maneuvers. As their size and caliber increased, though, the guns likewise became increasingly heavy and cumbersome, restricting their role to static defense. Consequently, during World War II, both sides were compelled to make anti-tank guns self-propelled, greatly increasing their mobility.

The first self-propelled anti-tank guns were merely belated attempts to make use of obsolete tanks, such as the Panzerjäger I, which was a Czech 4.7-cm Pak (t) gun mated to a Panzer I chassis. (Note: The Panzer I was a light tank that had been brought into service for training and developing German armor divisions and made up large proportion of German forces until the large scale production of medium tanks (Panzer III and Panzer IV) and were used in the Battle of France The trend continued with older tanks and captured vehicles, which were available in large numbers for conversions to self-propelled guns when they were replaced by heavier and better-armed (and armored) tanks. Although just a makeshift solution, these initial experiments proved so successful that they spawned an entire class of new vehicles: dedicated tank destroyers.

The US Army's early self-propelled anti-tank guns were 75 mm on M2 half-tracks (entering service in 1941) to complement towed artillery and M6 gun motor carriage, a 37 mm on a 4-wheel-drive Dodge truck (1942). US tank destroyer doctrine emphasized mobility to position tank destroyers for ambushes against tank attacks.

Tank destroyers offered some advantages over towed anti-tank guns, since a static gun emplacement sacrificed concealment and surprise after firing the first shot, whereas the same gun mounted on a tracked or wheeled chassis could open fire, throw a tank formation into substantial disarray, and then quickly withdraw to repeat the same tactic elsewhere. The introduction of tank destroyers also put an end to the traditional tactic of suppressing anti-tank gun batteries with heavy artillery bombardments, as their crews were now well-protected under armor. They were not without their own series of disadvantages, however, namely presenting a much larger target than a towed gun, the added responsibilities of vehicle maintenance and logistical support, and the limited spaces in which the crew had to operate and stow all their available ammunition.

By the end of the war, dedicated tank destroyers had been superseded by tanks, which were just as effective at destroying other tanks, and little incentive remained to continue their separate development. Nevertheless, much like towed anti-tank guns, they were widely exported and are still in service with some militaries in the late 20th and early 21st century.

== See also ==
- Anti-tank grenade
- Anti-tank warfare
- List of anti-tank guns
- Tank gun
- Man-portable anti-tank systems
