= Pușcă Automată model 1986 =

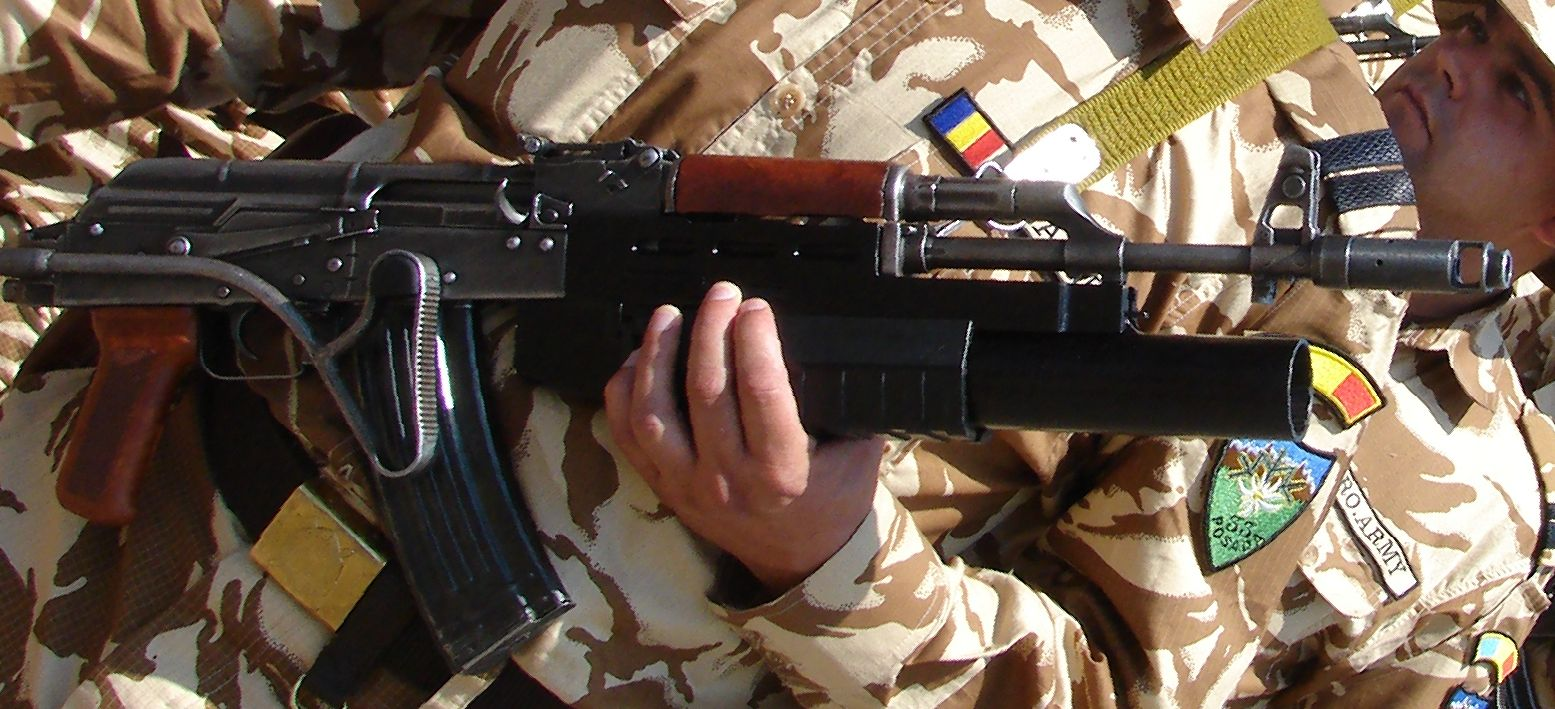
- The PA md. 86 with AG-40 grenade launcher.
- Type: Assault rifle
- Place of origin: Socialist Republic of Romania

Service history
- In service: 1986–present
- Used by: See Users
- Wars: Romanian Revolution; War in Abkhazia (1992–1993); Transnistria War; War in Afghanistan; Russo-Georgian War

Production history
- Designer: Romtehnica
- Designed: 1986
- Manufacturer: ROMARM via Regia Autonomă pentru producţia de Tehnică Militară (RATMIL), Cugir
- Produced: 1986–present

Specifications
- Mass: 3.69 kg (8.14 lb)
- Length: 943 mm (37.1 in) stock extended / 748 mm (29.4 in) stock folded
- Barrel length: 432 mm (17.0 in)
- Cartridge: 5.45×39mm
- Caliber: .22
- Action: Gas-actuated, rotating bolt
- Rate of fire: 700 rounds/min
- Muzzle velocity: 880 m/s (2,887 ft/s)
- Effective firing range: 100 to 1,000 m sight adjustments
- Feed system: 30-round detachable box magazine
- Sights: Rear sight notch sight on sliding tangent, front post

The Pușcă Automată model 1986 (automatic rifle model 1986, abbreviated PA md. 86 or simply md. 86) is the standard assault rifle used by the Romanian Military Forces. It is manufactured in Cugir, Romania by the ROMARM firm, located in Bucharest. The export name for this variant is the AIMS-74.

== History ==
As the Soviet Union switched from the 7.62×39mm caliber AKM to the 5.45×39mm caliber AK-74, it encouraged other nations of the Warsaw Pact to follow suit.

By the mid 1980s, Romania decided to switch calibers, but it was decided that the new rifle would be developed independently, and not represent a clone of the Soviet AK-74. In doing so, the PA md. 86 has several anachronistic AKM elements that were found only on the prototype Soviet AK-74.

== Features ==
The most easily recognized AKM feature is the gas block design (45 degree versus 90 degree). Incidentally, although the gas block is purely AKM, the gas vent in the barrel did change to a 90-degree design to minimize bullet shearing (a problem with early Soviet AK-74s with 45-degree gas blocks). This means the Romanian PA md. 86 has a double-angle gas port, which makes it much harder to clean the gas vent. This variant also uses the AK-47 rear trunnion, and thus the siderail is lengthened.

Romanian soldier firing a PA md. 86. Note the angled charging handle.

It uses either a "bird cage" flash suppressor, or a flash hider (designed for Special Forces). The design also incorporates an upward-curved charging handle, a wire side-folding stock (based on the East German design, but offset slightly to the left and featuring a button-release instead of a lever), and a traditional vertical handgrip. The md. 86 uses laminated wood lower handguards, and Bakelite pistol grips and upper handguards. None of the components have had any polymer versions.

The AG-40 grenade launcher can be attached as a lower handguard after removing the standard one. Lasers/lights can also be clamped to the barrel in two ways. The rifle is one of only a few AK versions that have a 3-round burst option, with the Polish Tantal being the only other Warsaw Pact variant. The burst mode is achieved through a ratcheting device on the left side of the receiver that interacts with the trigger group on the trigger-disconnector and hammer pins. Its location eliminates the need for an anti-pin walkout device, such as a Shepard's Crook on semi-auto AKs and extended auto sear spring on full-autos. It also has an advantage to the M16 rifle's burst mode in that releasing the trigger in the middle of a burst (1–2 shot fired instead of full 3) causes the ratchet to reset making the next 3-round burst a new, full one instead of a continuation of the previous. The Tantal functions in a similar manner with ratcheting device on trigger-disconnector and hammer pins, though has a separate safety and selector switch and eliminates the rate reducer. The safety stop is cut lower allowing the selector to travel further down just off the edge of the receiver for its burst mode position and as such has the following markings, from top to bottom: ∞, 1, 3. Only ribbed steel magazines are used.

Combat divers also use a version with straight handguards, as the forward grip is considered to be cumbersome for amphibious operations.

== Variants ==
=== Carbine version ===
This rifle also has a rarely seen short-barrel version, PM md. 94 (model 94 submachine gun), where the front sight is placed on the gas block, with the gas tube being shortened. This version uses straight laminated wood handguards.

=== Civilian variants ===
The 5.45×39mm civilian export versions are: Romak 992, Romak 2, Intrac Mk II, CUR-2, WUM-2, SAR 2, and the WASR 2 which is the current production rifle. The WASR 2 does not have a dimpled receiver, unlike previous models.

=== 5.45 mm RPK ===
The RPK version of the md. 86 is called the md. 93. It features a long reinforced receiver, a carry handle, and a bipod. An earlier, short-lived version used a fire control group similar to the 7.62 mm md. 64, "Safe – Auto – Single". The md. 93 changed this to the md. 86 style "Safe – Auto – Single – Burst".

== Users ==
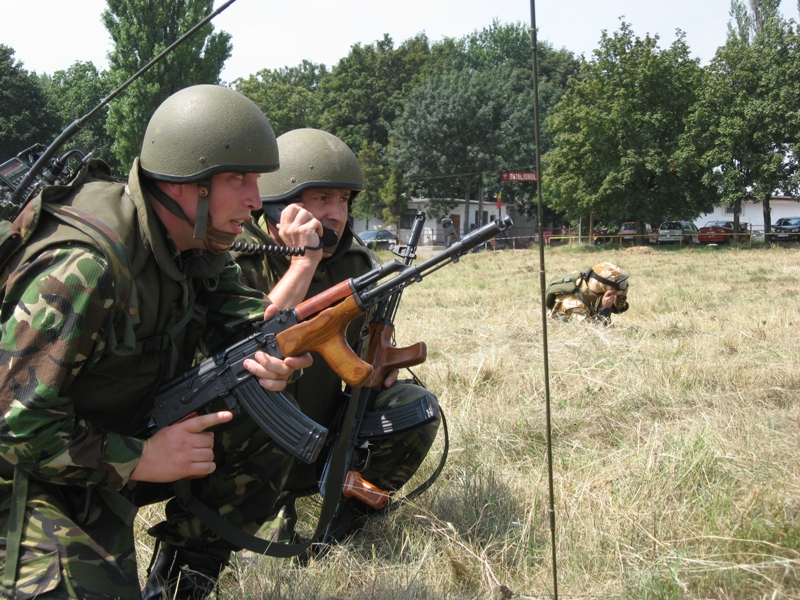
Romanian Infantry training with the PA md. 86.

- Georgia
- Paraguay
- Romania

=== Non-state actors ===
- Kurdistan Workers' Party

== See also ==
- Pistol Mitralieră model 1963/1965
