= ROMARM =

Romanian state-owned defense company

ROMARM S.A National Company
- Native name: Romanian: Compania Națională ROMARM S.A.
- Type: State-owned corporation
- Industry: Defense
- Founded: October 19, 2000; 26 years ago
- Headquarters: Bucharest, Romania
- Area served: worldwide
- Products: Munitions, Firearms, Artillery, Explosives, Combat vehicles
- Revenue: €314 million (2025)
- Number of employees: 7300 (2012)
- Website: romarm.ro/en/

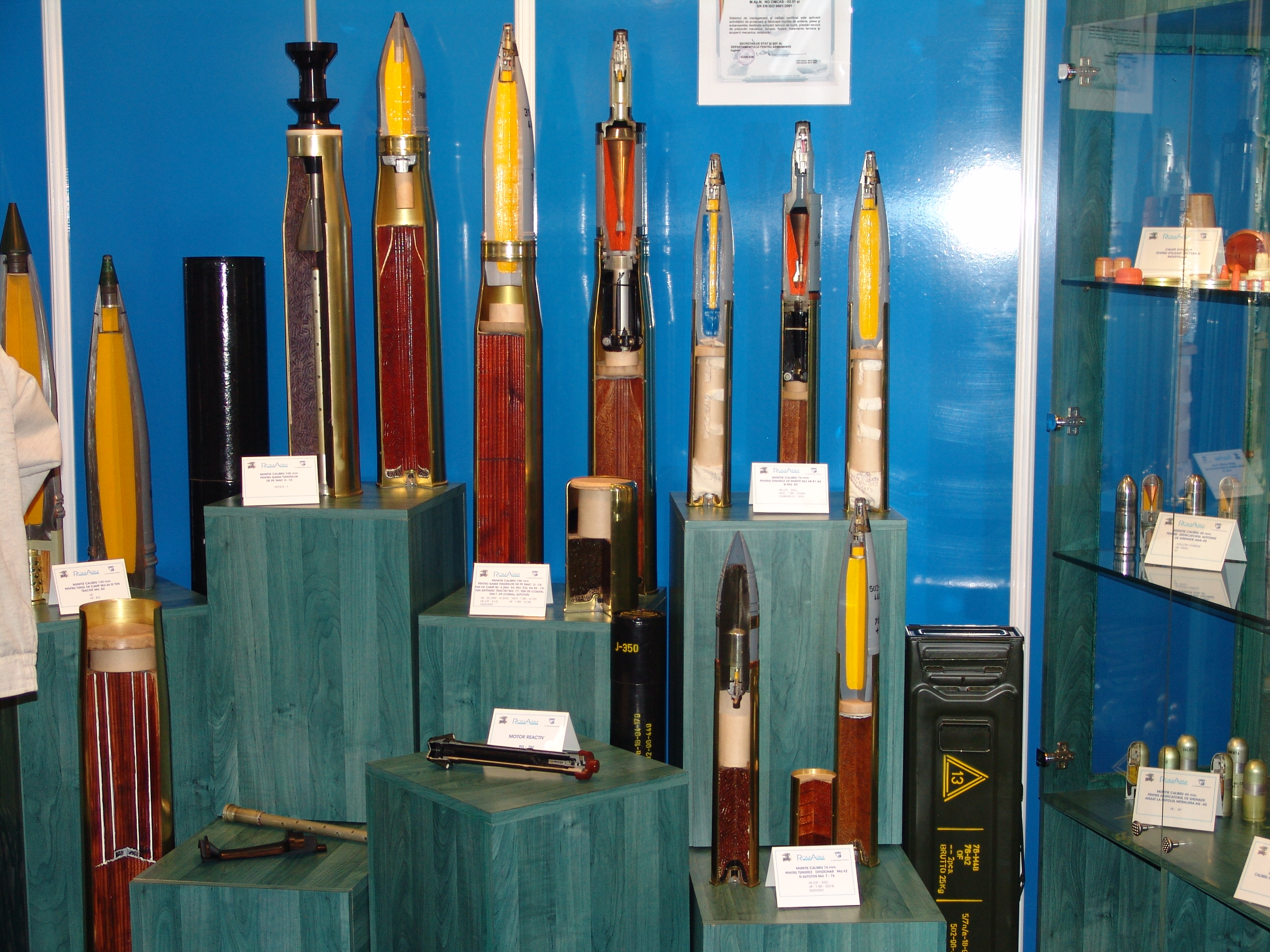
High caliber ammunition made by ROMARM on display at Expomil '05

ROMARM is a Romanian state-owned defense company and Romania's main supplier for defense technique and services. The company owns 15 factories and a research institute.

== Subsidiaries ==
=== Arsenal Reșița ===
Arsenal Reșița was founded in 1972 in order to produce medium and large cannons. Due to the decrease in sales, the company started offering civilian services as well in 1990. The company became part of ROMARM in 2001. The factory, based in Reșița, produces today various types of artillery and anti-aircraft guns.

=== Carfil ===
Carfil was founded in 1922 as "Machinery and Foundry Factory Dumitru Voina". It changed its name to 1969 and became part of ROMARM in 2001. In 2005 it started producing weapons and ammunition compatible with NATO standards.

Starting from 2025, Carfil began producing a variety of military drones in cooperation with the US-based company Periscope Aviation.

=== Electromecanica Ploiești ===
Initially founded in 1955 as an ammunition repair and anti-aircraft artillery factory, Electromecanica Ploiești has changed its name multiple times since then. The company currently produces a variety of missiles.

=== Făgăraș Powders Factory ===
It was established in 1920 in Făgăraș as an explosives factory, and began production in 1921. From 1939, it began producing powders. Renamed "Făgăraș Powders Factory" in 2006, the plant specializes in producing high-power explosives.

=== Cugir Arms Factory ===
Officially Uzina Mecanică Cugir ("Cugir Mechanical Plant"). One of the oldest defense companies of Romania, Cugir Arms Factory has a history that can be traced back to 1799 when steel manufacturing workshops were founded in Cugir. Having gone through multiple upgrades throughout its existence, Cugir Arms Factory now produces products compatible with NATO standards.

=== Metrom ===
Metrom was founded in 1948 as a merger of two companies: FAROLA and METROM SAR. The new official name of the company was METROM Factory Brașov.

=== Moreni Mechanical Plant ===
Initially named IAM, the company was founded in 1968. The factory is today the only defense company of Romania that produces armoured personnel carriers.

=== Pirochim Victoria ===
The factory's life began before World War II due to the Romanian state's need of an armament factory. While it was extended at one point to produce a higher range of products, Pirochim Victoria now produces specialty products and is under the authority of Romania's Ministry of Economy and Commerce.

=== Plopeni Mechanical Plant ===
The plant's history begins in 1937 when the construction for a plant to manufacture ammunition and war artillery started. In 1941 the plant became operational under the name Mărgineanca Plant. The plant produces different types of ammunition today.

=== Tohan ===
Tohan was founded in 1938 as part of the MALAXA industrial group. Between 1948 and 1990 it was called "6 March" Factory Zărnești and from 1990 to 1998 it changed its name again to Mechanical Plant Tohan Zărnești. Today, the Tohan Factory specializes in producing artillery munition and missiles.

=== Mija Mechanical Plant ===
It was established on 5 November 1938 as Întreprinderea Română Mecanică și Chimică (the "Romanian Mechanical and Chemical Enterprise"). The factory was producing 50 kg, 100 kg and 225 kg aviation bombs, anti-tank mines, smoke equipment and other products for the Army. Today, it manufactures anti-tank munitions for the AG-7 and AG-9, hand grenades, and other products.

=== Sadu Mechanical Plant ===
It is located in Bumbești-Jiu. Established through High Decree no. 3010/1939, the Sadu Mechanical Plant is the successor to Pirotehnia Armatei ("Army Pyrotechnics"), which was founded in Bucharest in 1861. Originally it was called Pirotehnia Armatei Sadu, but was renamed to Uzina Mecanică Sadu in 1945. In 1970, the Sadu II industrial platform was built for the manufacture of infantry weapons, primers for the various types of ammunition, as well as mining explosives. From 2002, it became a subsidiary to ROMARM, and from 2014 it changed its name to Societatea "Uzina Mecanică Sadu" SA. Today, it produces small arms munitions, in both NATO and Warsaw Pact calibers.

=== Bucharest Mechanical Factory ===
The Bucharest Mechanical Plant (Uzina Mecanică București - UMB) was established in 1978, as an annex plant of the "23 August" Bucharest Factory, under the title "Special Heavy Machinery Factory". In December 1990, it received the name the "Bucharest Mechanical Plant", being taken over by the Ministry of National Defense, as a component unit of the Army Industrial Group - Autonomous Directorate. After 10 years, the plant comes under the authority of the Ministry of Industry and Resources and is renamed S.C. "ARSENAL" S.A. - Bucharest branch.

In 2001, following the reorganization of the defense industry, the unit reverted its name to the Bucharest Mechanical Plant and became a subsidiary of ROMARM.

The factory currently produces Mowag Piranha V armored vehicles as a joint venture with General Dynamics European Land Systems. It has also produced the TR-85M1 upgrade of the TR-85.

=== UPS Dragomirești ===
Uzina de Produse Speciale Dragomirești (the "Dragomirești Special Products Plant") was founded in 1981. It produces aircraft bombs, 40 mm grenades, artillery ammunition, explosives for military or police use, and explosive charges for mining. It became a subsidiary to ROMARM in 2001.

=== Centre of Excellence in Research, Development and Innovation ===
Founded in October 2022 as a new subsidiary of ROMARM, the Centre of Excellence in Research, Development and Innovation Bucharest (CECDI Bucharest) works as a research and development center of the Romanian defense industry. Besides the military area, CECDI Bucharest also works in areas of industrial and commercial nature and can carry out other R&D-related activities.

== See also ==
- Arms industry in Romania
