= Spike =

Spike, spikes, or spiking may refer to:

== Arts, entertainment, and media ==
=== Books ===
- The Spike (novel), a novel by Arnaud de Borchgrave
- The Spike (Broderick book), a nonfiction book by Damien Broderick
- The Spike, a starship in Peter F. Hamilton's The Evolutionary Void

=== Comics ===
- Spike (DC Thomson) a British comics anthology published by DC Thomson
- Spike (IDW Publishing), an American comic book series featuring the Buffy the Vampire Slayer character

=== Film and television ===
- Spike (2008 film), directed by Robert Beaucage
- Spike (dog actor)
- Spike (TV channel), a former name of the American cable network Paramount Network
  - 5Spike, a former localized British version of the American channel
  - Spike (Australian TV channel), a localized version of the American channel
  - Spike (Dutch TV channel), a localized version of the American channel
- "Spike!", a segment of the 2017 Thai TV series Project S: The Series

=== Music ===
- Spike (Agata album), 2004
- Spike (Puffy AmiYumi album), 2001
- Spike (Elvis Costello album), 1989
- Spike (music), a part of certain stringed instruments
- "Spike", a song by Tom Petty and the Heartbreakers from the album Southern Accents
- "Spike", a song by The Network from the album Money Money 2020
- "Spikes", a song by Death Grips from the album Bottomless Pit

=== Periodicals ===
- Spike Art Magazine, an art magazine based in Berlin and Vienna est. 2004
- Spike Magazine, an internet cultural journal which began in 1996

=== Other uses in arts, entertainment, and media ===
- Spike (character), a list of fictional characters named Spike
- Spike (company), a video game company
- Spike (journalism), to decide not to publish or publicize a story
- Spike (stagecraft), markings on a stage to show the correct positioning of objects and actors
- Spike (video game), a 1983 platform game for the Vectrex video game system

== Biology and medicine ==
- Spike (botany), a kind of inflorescence in which sessile flowers are arranged on an unbranched elongated axis
- Spike (neuroscience), or action potential
- SPIKES, a clinical protocol used to break bad news to patients
- Spike protein, a structure projecting from the surface of an enveloped virus, which binds to host cells
- Spine (zoology), a hard, needle-like anatomical structure

== People ==
=== Names ===
- Spike (nickname), a list of people
- Spike (surname), a list of people
- Spikes (surname), a list of people

=== People with the name or stage name ===
==== In film ====
- Spike Jonze, an American filmmaker
- Spike Lee, an American filmmaker

==== In music ====
- Spike (musician), singer of The Quireboys
- Spike (Welsh guitarist), stage name of Mike Williams
- Spike, stage name of Frans van Zoest, guitar player of rock band Di-rect
- Spike Jones, American bandleader and humorist
- Spike Slawson, American punk vocalist and bassist of the Swinging Utters and Me First and the Gimme Gimmes
- Spike Xavier, lead singer of nu metal band Corporate Avenger

==== In professional wrestling ====
- Spike Dudley, the ring name of American professional wrestler Matthew Jonathan Hyson (born 1970)
- Moondog Spike, the ring name of American professional wrestler Bill Smithson
- Spike Huber, a professional wrestler from the United States Wrestling Association
- Spike, a professional wrestler, half of the Gorgeous Ladies of Wrestling tag team The Heavy Metal Sisters

== Sport ==
- Spike (gridiron football), a play in American football
- Spike (volleyball), a form of volleyball attack
- Spikes (mascot), the mascot of the Minor League AAA Rochester Red Wings
- State College Spikes, a baseball team that plays in the MLB Draft League
- Track spikes, lightweight shoes with spikes screwed into their bottom, or spike plate, in order to maximize traction

== Technology ==
=== Computing ===
- Spike (application), an email app which displays email in a chat-like format
- Spike (database), a biological database
- Spiking (fintech), a social trading platform
- Spike (software development), a small task done to reduce uncertainty about a larger task
- Spike (simulator), the gold standard of the RISC-V architecture
- SPIKE algorithm, a mathematical parallel algorithm for solving banded systems of linear equations
- Spike, a command in Microsoft Word

=== Mechanical devices ===
- Cleat (shoe), a protrusion on the sole of a shoe to provide traction
  - Track spikes, lightweight shoes with spikes screwed into their bottom, or spike plate
- Nail (fastener), or spike, especially one over ten inches (25 cm) long
  - Rail spike, used to construct railroad tracks
  - Screw spike, used to construct railroad tracks
- Spike strip, a device used to impede or stop the movement of wheeled vehicles
- Spindle (stationery), an upright spike used to hold papers

=== Other uses in technology ===
- Spike (missile) an Israeli fourth generation anti-tank guided missile (ATGM)
- NAVAIR Spike
- Voltage spike, also called an electrical surge, an electronic glitch
- Spiking a gun, temporarily disabling a gun by driving a spike into its touch hole

== Other uses ==
- Spike, to add alcohol or another recreational drug to a typically non-alcoholic drink or foodstuff
  - Mickey Finn (drugs), a drink laced with an incapacitating drug
- Spike, a colloquial name for a workhouse
- Spike, Michigan, a former settlement
- Needle spiking, alleged surreptitious injection of drugs
- Tree spiking, a radical environmentalist tactic
- Virgin's Spike (Latin: spīca virginis), for the star Spica
- Sungai Petani–Inner Kedah Expressway, a proposed expressway in Kedah, Malaysia

== See also ==
- Spiked (disambiguation)
- Spiker (disambiguation)
- The Spike (disambiguation)
- Golden Spike (disambiguation)
- Spike Island (disambiguation)
