= Monimbo =

1983 novel by Arnaud de Borchgrave and Robert Moss

Monimbo is the 1983 follow-up novel to the 1980 Arnaud De Borchgrave-Robert Moss spy thriller The Spike.

== Plot ==
Fidel Castro attends a conference in Monimbo, Nicaragua. It begins with the kidnapping of a U.S. Senator in Puerto Rico by the Puerto Rican separatist movement Los Macheteros. Bob Hockney is now the Miami Bureau chief of the New York World. Hockney and his wife Julia, are caught up in the 1980 Liberty City Riots. The Miami Police Department loses control of the situation in Miami, and Cuban and Nicaraguan communists sabotage the electrical grid and blow up bridges to disable and disrupt the United States. The book incorporates real-world elements such as the Mariel Boat Lift into its conspiracy theory.

== Critical response ==
In their review, New York Magazine found it "swifter and more intelligent than Robert Ludlum's" work, though the publication accused it of wallowing in blood. People magazine found it violent and full of right-wing paranoia. The London Review of Books found the dialog poor and criticized the way real people were awkwardly shoehorned into the plot. It was also reviewed in National Review.
