= Guided Multipurpose Munition =

Swedish/American infantry guided missile

- Type: Infantry guided missile
- Place of origin: United States; Sweden

Production history
- Designer: Saab Group; Raytheon

Specifications
- Mass: 6.8 kg (15 lb)
- Diameter: 84 mm
- Warhead: Multipurpose
- Propellant: Solid fuel rocket
- Operational range: 2,500 meters
- Guidance system: Semi-active laser
- Launch platform: Carl Gustaf 8.4 cm recoilless rifle AT4

The Guided Multipurpose Munition (GMM) is an infantry precision guided munition being developed by Saab Group and Raytheon.

== Development ==
After the unveiling of the lightweight M4 Carl Gustaf in October 2014, Saab began developing a concept dubbed the Ultra Light Missile, a guided round that could be fired from the recoilless rifle out to extended ranges.

In November 2017, Saab and Raytheon teamed up to further cooperate on the project, and in September 2018 they were awarded a contract to answer a U.S. Special Operations Command (SOCOM) requirement for a precision guided Gustaf round. It was unveiled publicly as the Guided Carl Gustaf Munition (GCGM) in October 2018.

Test firings of the GCGM were conducted in September 2019 in Sweden. Two inert rounds were fired at stationary targets from 1,400 m away, and a third inert round hit a moving target at 1,800 m. In addition to tests in the U.S., the GCGM had 11 successful firings in 2019.

In November 2020, the weapon was demonstrated at Yuma Proving Ground. As it had been adapted to be launched from the AT4, the name was changed to the Guided Multipurpose Munition since it was no longer strictly related to the Carl Gustaf. Seven rounds were fired with live warheads, four from the Carl Gustaf and three from AT4s, against different types of targets such as a triple brick wall, a double-reinforced concrete wall and an up-armored vehicle at distances from 1,550 to 2,500 m.

== Design ==
The GMM is guided by semi-active laser (SAL) homing which can be directed by a laser designator either mounted on the launcher or used by an assistant, capable of firing in lock on before launch (LOBL) and lock-on after launch (LOAL) modes to track and engage moving targets out to 2,500 m; other seeker options including imaging infrared (IIR) are also under consideration.

The GMM has a dual charge multipurpose warhead capable of defeating bunkers, concrete, and light armored vehicles fitted with explosive reactive armor (ERA). It can be fired from enclosed spaces using a two-stage soft launch propulsion system with a small booster motor to eject it out of the launcher before the main motor ignites.

The GMM missile weighs 6.8 kg (15 lb) and can be fired from the Carl Gustaf recoilless rifle or an adaptation of the AT4 disposable launcher; the missile case has the 84 mm diameter of the tubes, but the diameter of the missile itself is slightly less to avoid interference between the folding control and lift wings that steer it and the launcher's interior.

In the future the GMM could also be employed from remote weapon stations (RWS), manned and unmanned aerial, ground, and naval systems, and possibly indirect fires such as mortar systems.

== See also ==
- NLAW
- QN-202
- Spike-SR
- FGM-172 SRAW
- Spike F2M2
- MBDA Enforcer
- Raytheon Pike
- List of gun-launched missiles
