= MGM-51 Shillelagh =

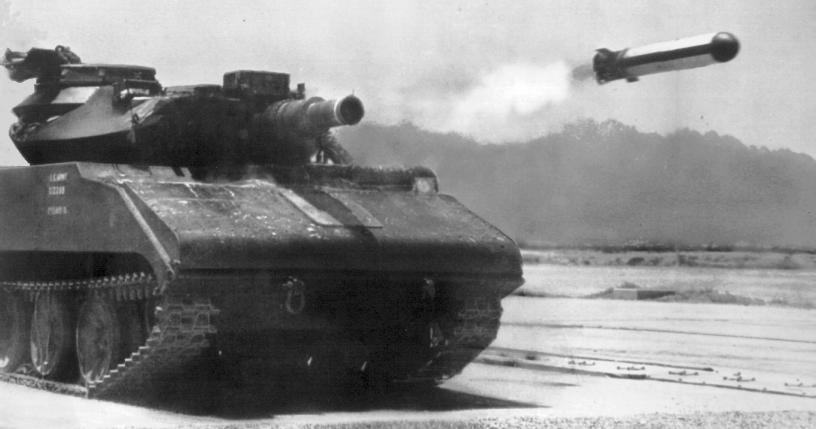
- MGM-51 Shillelagh
- Type: Surface-to-surface missile
- Place of origin: United States

Production history
- Manufacturer: Aeronutronic, Martin Marietta
- Unit cost: from $1,938 to US$4,052 (equivalent to $32,213 in 2025)
- Produced: 88,194 from 1964 to 1971

Specifications
- Mass: MGM-51A: 59.1 lb (26.8 kg); MGM-51B/C:61.3 lb (27.8 kg)
- Length: MGM-51A: 3 feet 7.7 inches (1.110 m); MGM-51B/C: 3 feet 9.4 inches (1.153 m)
- Diameter: 6 inches (150 mm)
- Wingspan: 11.5 inches (290 mm)
- Warhead: 15 pounds (6.8 kg) Shaped Charge Warhead including 8 pounds (3.6 kg) of Octol Explosive able to defeat 23.62 inches (600 mm) of RHA at 0° obliquity
- Detonation mechanism: detonated on impact
- Engine: Amoco Chemicals Hercules solid-fuel rocket
- Operational range: MGM-51A: 6,600 ft (2,000 m); MGM-51B/C: 10,000 ft (3,000 m)
- Maximum speed: 1,060 feet per second (320 m/s)
- Guidance system: Infra-red signal link
- Launch platform: Tank (M551 Sheridan, MBT/KPz-70, and M60A2)

The Ford MGM-51 Shillelagh was an American anti-tank guided missile designed to be launched from a conventional gun (cannon). It was originally intended to be the medium-range portion of a short, medium, and long-range system for armored fighting vehicles in the 1960s and '70s to defeat future armor without an excessively large gun. Developing a system that could fire both shells and missiles reliably proved complex and largely unworkable for the United States.

It was originally developed for the experimental but never produced MBT-70 tank and served most notably as a primary weapon of the M551 Sheridan light tank, but the missile system was not issued to units serving in South Vietnam and was retired in 1996. It was also used on the M60A2 "Starship", which was phased out by 1981. Ultimately, very few of the 88,000 rounds produced were ever fired in combat, and the system was largely succeeded by the later BGM-71 TOW wire-guided missile, which was fielded in 1970. Western forces largely gave up on the gun-launched missile concept, although it remains in use on former Soviet Union designs.

The name of the system is that of a traditional wooden club from Ireland.

== Background ==
With the rapid increase in armor thickness during World War II, tanks were becoming increasingly able to survive rounds fired from even the largest of World War II-era anti-tank guns. A new generation of guns, notably the British 105 mm Royal Ordnance L7, were able to cope with newer tanks, but it appeared that in another generation the guns needed would be too large to be practical.

To overcome this potential difficulty, the US Army began to favor high-explosive anti-tank (HEAT), or shaped charge rounds in the 1950s. A shaped charge's penetration is not strongly dependent on the speed of the round, allowing rounds to be fired at much lower velocities, and thus from much lighter guns. They also work better at larger diameters, and a large-diameter low-velocity gun makes for an excellent assault gun that can be mounted on light or medium-weight vehicles. However, the low speed of the round makes it hard to aim over longer distances. The US Army sought to overcome this problem by developing guided missiles that had shaped charge warheads and were accurate beyond a few hundred yards.

== Development ==
In 1958, the Army thought that existing knowledge was sufficient to begin work on a guided missile with a HEAT warhead, and in June 1959 Sperry and Ford Aeronutronic were asked for designs to fill the shorter range role. Ford won the contract and started work on the XM13. The first test shots were fired in 1960, and limited production started in 1964. The missile was then known as the MGM-51A.

The basic system was quite advanced for its day. The missile body consisted of a long tube with fold-out fins at the extreme rear, which was propelled from the new M81 gun with a small charge strapped on the rear. Once clear of the gun, the fins popped open and the engine ignited. To keep the missile from spinning while in the gun due to the rifling, a small "key" fitted into a straight groove in the rifled gun. Aiming the missile was simple; the gunner simply kept his gunsight on the target, while electronics in the sighting system tracked the missile optically and sent corrections through an IR link, similarly to a TV remote control. In general the gunners were able to achieve excellent hit rates.

The main problem with the system is firing the main gun with a projectile vs. a missile. The recoil from the gun throws all the missile optics off, limiting the use of the M551 to either anti-tank or bunker buster.

Because the system was so advanced, the development of the Shillelagh was fraught with problems. Ford Aeronutronic underestimated the complexity of the task of designing a missile as advanced as this, and there were major problems with the propellant, igniter, tracker and infrared command link of the missile.

== Users ==
=== Sheridan ===
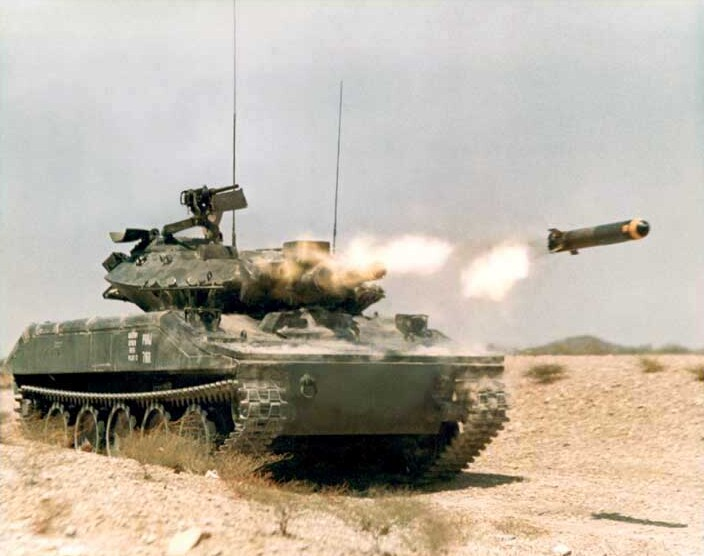
MGM-51 Shillelagh fired from a Sheridan

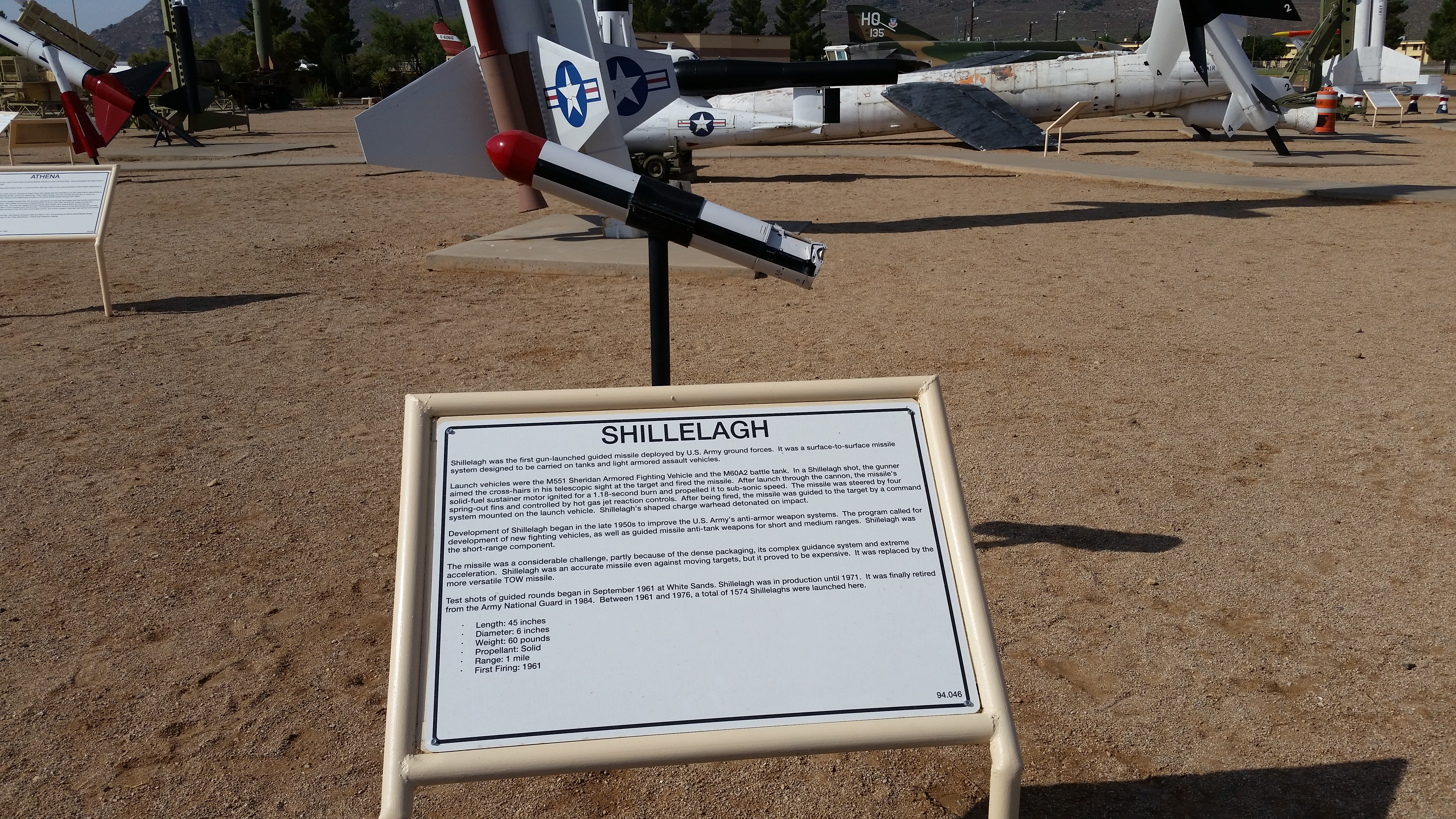
White Sands Missile Range Museum Shillelagh display

The M81/MGM-51 was first installed on the M551 Sheridan. The Sheridan was a light aluminum-armored AFV designed to be air transportable and provide anti-tank support for airborne forces. In 1966, the US Army began pressing General Westmoreland to field the tank in South Vietnam, but he declined, stating that with no main gun ammunition, the Sheridan was basically nothing more than a $300,000 machine gun platform. In 1968, 152 mm main gun ammo became available, and the Sheridan was deployed to South Vietnam for combat operations in January 1969. Shillelagh missiles did not prove to be a problem in the Vietnam War: they were not used.

The Sheridans' 152 mm main guns were used in combat operations in Vietnam but proved troublesome. The combustible casings of the 152 mm caseless ammunition rounds did not burn completely, requiring a complicated and slow gas-driven scavenging system. They were also liable to detonate if the vehicle was hit. Firing the gun caused such a large recoil as to result in failures in the delicate missile firing electronics on the tank. These problems, in combination with the lack of suitable targets, resulted in their deployment without the complex missile system.

The Shillelagh was considerably larger than a conventional round, so only a small number could be carried. Typical loads consisted of only nine missiles and twenty M409 HEAT rounds for short-range use. In addition, the missile proved to have a very long minimum range. Due to the layout of the vehicle, the missile did not come into the sight of the gun/tracker system until it was 800 yards (730 m) from the vehicle, at which point it could start to be guided. Because of its maximum range of about 2,200 yards (2,000 m), the system was only effective within a fairly narrow span of combat distances.

While the maximum range of 2,200 yards (2,000 m) was acceptable, the Army thought that it could and should be improved. Ford received a contract to develop a longer range version in 1963, and returned a slightly larger design the next year. Test firing of the new MGM-51B started the next May, and production began in October 1966. Besides the changes to the missile, the gun was modified. In testing it was found that the key slot in the gun led to cracking after firing only a few shells. After further study, a version with a shallower slot and new barrel was selected, creating the M81E1/MGM-51C.

The new missile was about 45 inches (1,100 mm) long, about 6 inches (150 mm) in diameter, and weighed 60 pounds (27 kg). It remained in production until 1971, by which time 88,000 had been produced, probably in anticipation of use by main battle tanks (below). Although the U.S. Army denied its usage, it is likely that six Shillelaghs were fired against Iraqi anti-tank guns and targets during Operation Desert Storm, the only usage of the weapon in anger.

=== M60A2 "Starship" ===
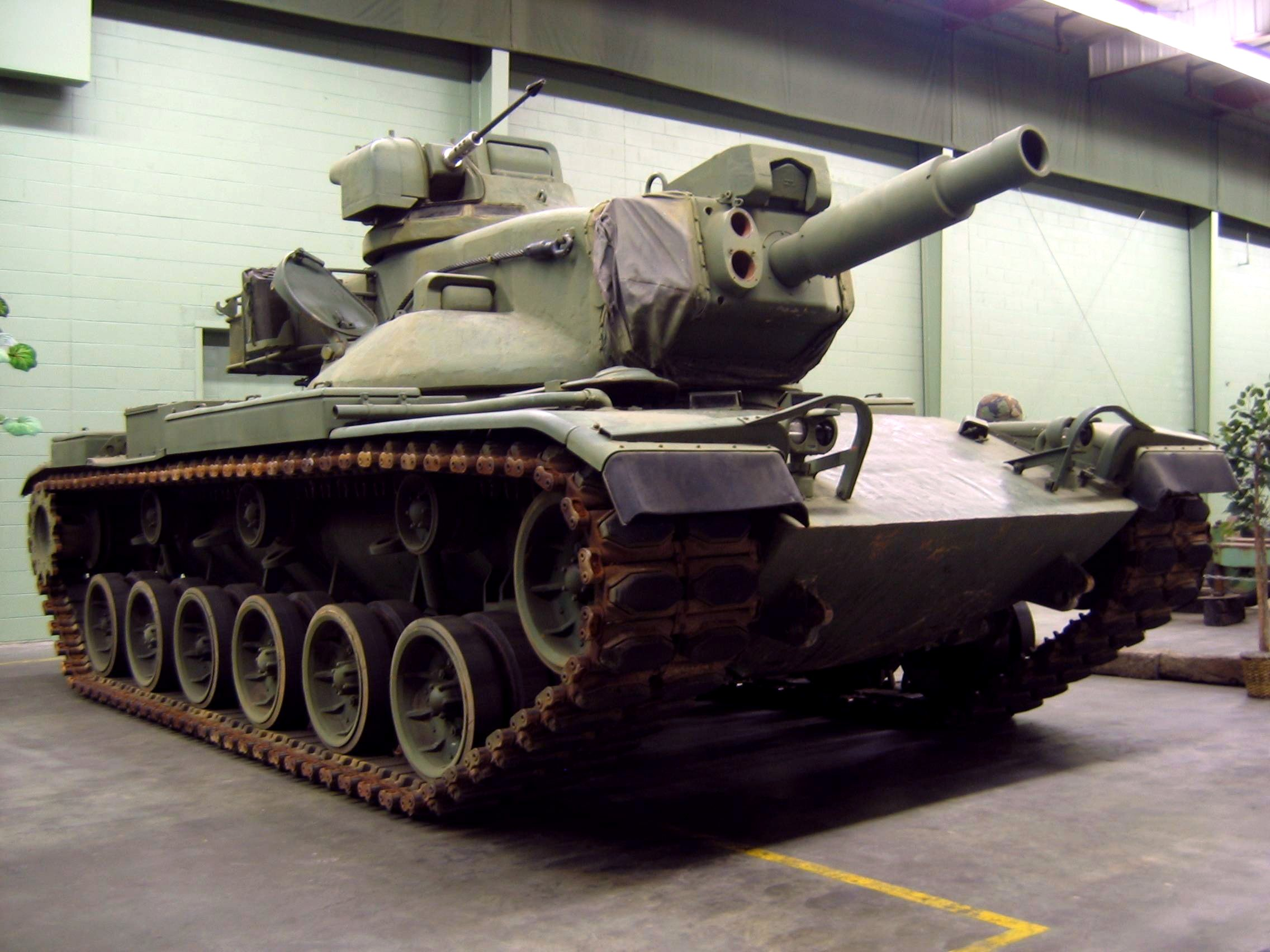
M60A2 "Starship" at the American Armored Foundation Museum in Danville, Virginia, July 2006.

Even with its problems, the system had shown that it could be used by an airborne tank to destroy a main battle tank. The question of whether or not it could fill its original role as the main armament of all tanks was still open. The Army had originally started development of a low-profile turret with a short barrel for their existing M60 tanks in the 1960s, but did not place an order for delivery until 1971, when the main problems with the system had been resolved. The Shillelagh-equipped M60A2s entered service in 1974, but were hampered by reliability problems, and were phased out in 1980. The final revision of the M60A3 used the same 105 mm gun and turret as the M60A1.

=== MBT-70 ===
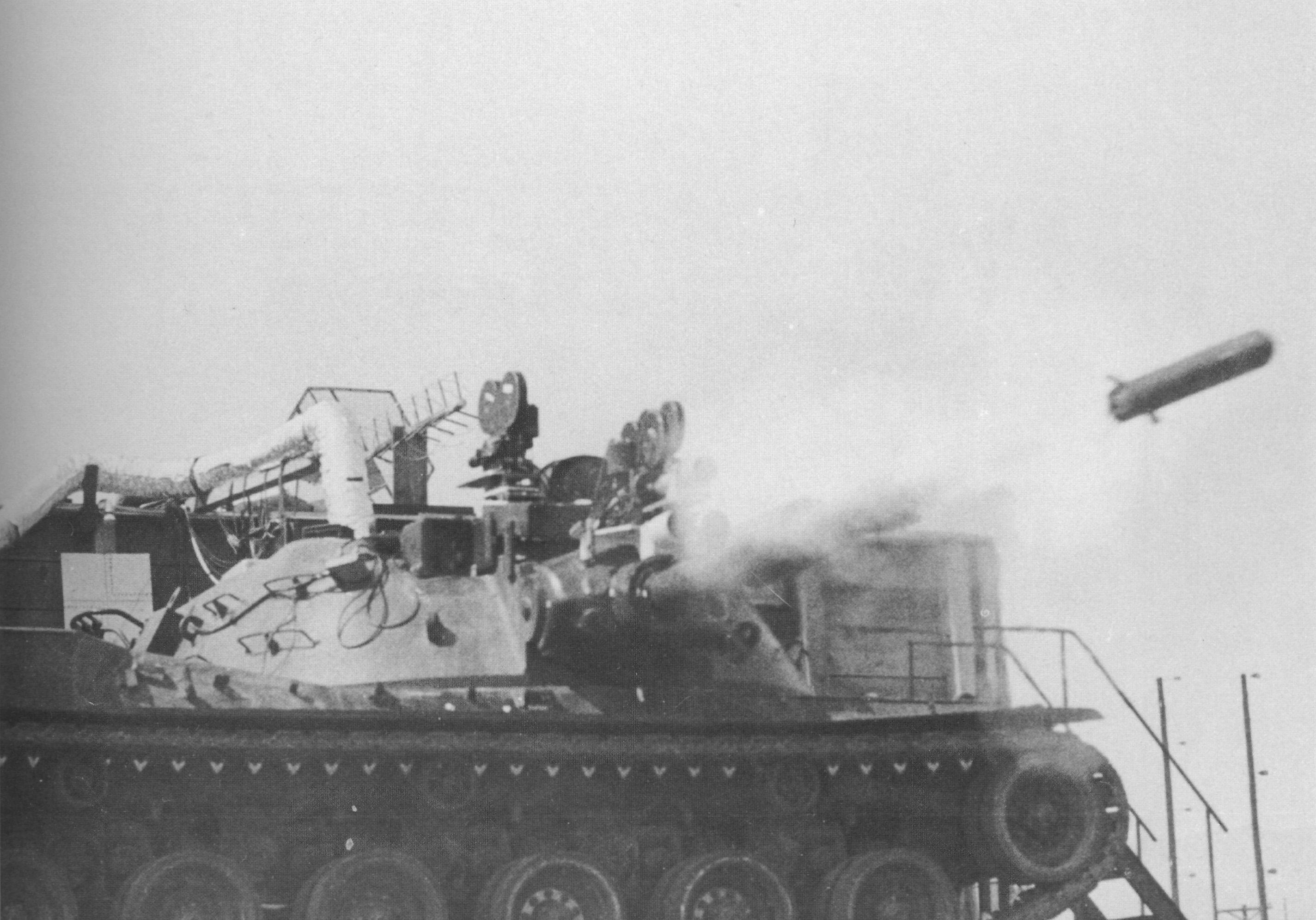
MBT-70 prototype test firing an MGM-51

The most ambitious project based on the Shillelagh was the MBT-70, an advanced US–German tank. Design work on the MBT-70 began in 1963. The tank mounted a huge auto-loader turret on top of a very short chassis, so short that there was no room for a driver in the front hull. Instead of being located in the conventional position, the driver was seated in the turret with the other crew members, in a rotating cupola that kept him facing forward. The gun was a new longer-barreled design, the XM-150, which extended range and performance to the point where it was useful for sabot type rounds as well. However, the project dragged on, and in 1969 the estimated unit cost had risen fivefold. Germany pulled out of the project. The Army proposed a "cut-down" version of the system, the XM-803, but Congress cancelled it in November 1971. It initiated and issued funds to the M1 Abrams project the next month. The M1 design incorporated a conventional gun.

== See also ==
- List of gun-launched missiles
- XM1111 Mid-Range Munition, U.S. unpowered 120mm guided munition canceled in 2009
