= Rob Buckman =

British doctor, comedian, author

- Born: Robert Alexander Amiel Buckman; 22 August 1948; London, United Kingdom
- Died: 9 October 2011 (aged 63); In transit flying from London to Toronto
- Education: St John's College, Cambridge
- Occupation: Professor of medicine
- Employer: University of Toronto

Robert Alexander Amiel Buckman (22 August 1948 – 9 October 2011) was a British doctor of medicine, comedian and author, and president of the Humanist Association of Canada. He first appeared in a Cambridge University Footlights Revue in 1968, and subsequently presented several television and radio programmes about medicine, as well as appearing on comedy programmes such as Just a Minute. He was also the author of many popular books on medicine.

== Early life and education ==
Buckman attended University College School and graduated in medicine from St John's College, Cambridge, in 1972. He continued his medical training at the Royal Marsden Hospital and University College Hospital, London, becoming a fellow of the Royal College of Physicians. Buckman was raised in a middle-class Jewish family.

== Broadcasting and comedy ==
Buckman was a familiar voice on BBC Radio 4 during the 1970s and 1980s, both on panel shows, and fronting one-off programmes on scientific topics. He contributed scripts to the sitcom Doctor on the Go, based on the Richard Gordon books. Together with fellow doctor Chris Beetles, he formed a comedy double act "Beetles and Buckman". The pair wrote and performed in the Pink Medicine Show TV series with Lynda Bellingham. They were two of the performers and writers of the first Secret Policeman's Ball fundraiser in 1979, with Billy Connolly, John Cleese and Eleanor Bron.

Buckman was television presenter of science programmes such as Don't Ask Me in the 1970s, and then the medical programme Where There's Life with Miriam Stoppard for its first three series from 1981. He continued this career in Canada where he contributed to TVOntario programmes such as Your Health and the CTV medical show Balance as well as frequent guest appearances on The Dini Petty Show. His television series Magic or Medicine? investigated alternative medicine and won a Gemini award, while Human Wildlife covered microbes in the domestic environment.

He was the subject of This Is Your Life in 1981 when he was surprised by Eamonn Andrews at University College Hospital in London.

He was a member of the atheists team on CBC's Test the Nation: IQ broadcast live on 24 January 2010.

== Writings in popular medicine ==
Besides tie-ins to his TV series, Buckman authored several books of medical humour, such as Out of Practice (1978), Jogging from Memory: or letters to Sigmund Freud (1980), and The Buckman Treatment; or a doctor's tour in North America (1989). Later, as Robert Buckman, he contributed as author or co-author to a series of What You Really Need to Know About... books on common medical conditions, including cancer, asthma, high blood pressure, HRT (all 1999), diabetes, stroke, and irritable bowel syndrome (2000). This was also the title of a long-running series of information films that he presented, and in many cases also scripted, for John Cleese's Video Arts company.

== Medical hiatus ==
In 1979, Buckman was diagnosed with dermatomyositis, an autoimmune disease which seriously affected his ability to work and was nearly fatal. His illness and recovery over the next couple of years was the subject of a 1981 UK TV documentary, Your Own Worst Enemy.

== Later career ==
Buckman emigrated to Toronto, Canada, in 1985 and initially stayed with his cousin, journalist Barbara Amiel. In 1994 he was named Canada's Humanist of the Year. He was a signer of Humanist Manifesto 2000. He was president of the Humanist Association of Canada and chair of the Advisory Board on Bioethics of the International Humanist and Ethical Union. His main popular work in humanism was Can We Be Good Without God? Biology, Behaviour and the Need to Believe. He was a founding member of the Centre for Inquiry Canada.

Buckman practised medical oncology at the Princess Margaret Hospital. He was a professor in the Department of Medicine at the University of Toronto and held an adjunct professorship at the M.D. Anderson Cancer Center in the US state of Texas. He specialised in breast cancer and teaching communication skills in oncology. In this role, he created the SPIKES protocol for delivering bad news to patients.

In 2006 he began writing a weekly column in The Globe and Mail.

== Death ==
Buckman died in his sleep while flying from London to Toronto on 9 October 2011. The cause is unknown. He was 63.

== Selected publications ==
- Out of Practice, illustrations by Bill Tidy. Deutsch. 1978.
- Jogging from Memory. Heinemann. 1980.
- Medicine Balls Too. Papermac. 1988.
- I Don't Know What To Say – How To Help and Support Someone Who Is Dying 1988.
- Not dead yet: the unauthorised autobiography of Dr. Robert Buckman, complete with a map, many photographs & irritating footnotes. Doublesday. 1990.
- How To Break Bad News: A Guide for Healthcare Professionals. Papermac. 1992.
- Magic or Medicine? An investigation of Healing and Healers (with Karl Sabbagh). Macmillan. 1993.
- Who can ever understand? : talking about your cancer with John Elsegood. 1995.
- What You Really Need to Know About Cancer: A Guide for Patients and their Families. Pan paperback. 1997.
- Robert Buckman. Anne Charlish. ed. What You Really Need to Know About Living With Depression. Lebhar-Friedman Books. 2000.
- Can We Be Good Without God?: Biology, Behavior, and the Need to Believe, Prometheus Books, 2002. ISBN 978-1-57392-974-5
- Human Wildlife: The Life That Lives on Us, Johns Hopkins University Press, 2003. ISBN 978-0-8018-7407-9
- Robert Buckman. With contributions by Dr. Pamela Catton and staff of Princess Margaret Hospital. Cancer is a Word, Not a Sentence. Firefly Books. 2006.

== See also ==
- Morality without religion
- Secular ethics
