= Spiker =

Spiker may refer to:

- Spike driver, a piece of rail transport maintenance of way equipment for driving spikes
- Spiker (film), 1986 sports drama
- Spiker (surname)

== See also ==
- Spike (disambiguation)
- Spyker (disambiguation)
