= Foot spike =

Foot spike may refer to:

== Biology ==
- Claw or talon, a pointed appendage found at the end of a toe or finger of many animals
  - The spur of the Platypus

== Clothing ==
- Cleat (shoe), also known as studs, protrusions or attachments of a shoe to provide additional traction
  - Crampon (traction aid), a traction device attached to footwear to improve mobility on snow and ice
  - Track spikes, a type of footwear featuring protruding spikes used by track athletes
- High-heeled shoe, also known as high heel, a type of shoe where the heel is raised above the ball of the foot
- Pointed shoe (disambiguation), a term used to refer to a variety of shoe styles
  - Sabaton, part of knight's body armor that covers the foot
- Spur, tool worn on the heel of riding boots

== Objects ==
- Caltrop, an area denial weapon made up of sharp nails or spines
- Footstool, a piece of furniture or support used to elevate the feet, some designs of which may incorporate soft spikes on their surface
- Stress ball, a malleable toy, some designs of which may incorporate soft spikes on their surface

== See also ==
- Foot
- Spike (disambiguation)
