= Pike (munition) =

- Type: Guided 40 mm grenade
- Place of origin: United States; Norway; Finland

Service history
- In service: 2019–present

Production history
- Designer: Raytheon; Nammo

Specifications
- Mass: 1.7 lb (0.77 kg)
- Length: 16.8 in (43 cm)
- Diameter: 40mm
- Crew: 1 or 2 (shooter alone or with a spotter)
- Maximum firing range: 2,000 m (2,200 yd; 1.2 mi) (dependent on firing angle)
- Warhead weight: 0.6 lb (9.6 oz; 270 g)
- Propellant: Nearly-smokeless
- Guidance system: Digital semi-active laser
- Launch platform: M320 Grenade Launcher Module, H&K EGLM

The Pike is a precision-guided mini-missile or grenade munition designed by Raytheon.

== History ==
Raytheon developed the weapon for three years in collaboration with Nammo Talley, which developed the warhead and propulsion system.

The Pike is intended to be more accurate with a longer range than rocket propelled grenades (RPGs) and standard rifle grenades, while being far lighter and more cost-effective than current infantry guided weapons like the $78,000 each FGM-148 Javelin.

At AUSA 2015, Raytheon revealed they had performed two successful test firings of the Pike.

== Design ==
The Pike is a 40 mm guided munition that can be fired from the barrel of a Heckler & Koch M320 and FN EGLM like a standard 40mm grenade, but is powered by a rocket motor to propel it 2,000 m (2,200 yd; 1.2 mi) to give infantrymen improved extended-range precision capabilities.

Further improvements could include different fuses, multiple-round simultaneous programming and targeting with data-link capabilities, and platform integration onto small boats, vehicles, and small unmanned aerial vehicles (UAVs).

=== Operation ===
The Pike uses a digital, semi-active laser seeker to guide itself to within five meters of the target; it can operate in a two-man shooter/spotter team or by the grenadier alone lazing after firing, as it can fly for 15 seconds before homing in.

When fired, Pike has a small propellant to "kick" it 2.5–3 m (8.2–9.8 ft) out of the tube before the nearly smokeless motor ignites, and range is dependent on firing angle. The munition is effective against fixed and slow-moving mid-range targets, using a 6/10 lb (9.6 oz; 0.27 kg) blast fragmentation warhead with a 10-meter lethality radius.

Pike weighs 1.7 lb (0.77 kg) and is 16.8 in (43 cm) long, too long to fit in the breech of the M203.

== Adoption ==
After its unveiling, Raytheon received permission to market the Pike to foreign governments, several of which have shown interest for infantry forces and special operators.

The Pike is more expensive than unguided RPGs and less powerful than a Javelin, yet it is cheaper than anti-tank missiles and powerful enough to blast through walls and other barriers.

While the M203 would have to be modified to swing out far enough to accept the round, the Pike can be fired from other launchers such as the break-open, M79 and large breech M320.

== Users ==
- Canada
  - Canadian special forces

== See also ==
- QN-202
- AeroVironment Switchblade
- Guided Multipurpose Munition
- Gyrojet
- NAVAIR Spike
- Rocket propelled grenade
- United States 40 mm grenades
