= The Spike =

The Spike may refer to:

- The Spike (novel), a 1980 novel by Arnaud de Borchgrave and Robert Moss
- The Spike (Broderick book), a 1997 nonfiction book by Damien Broderick
- "The Spike" (essay) by George Orwell
- The Spike (TV series), a controversial 1978 Irish television drama
- "The Spike", a 2008 song for The Music
- The Spire of Dublin
