= Spike Island =

Spike Island may refer to:

== Australia ==
- Spike Island (Tasmania)

== England ==
- Spike Island, Bristol, an area of the English port city of Bristol, adjoining the city centre
- Spike Island, Widnes, a park in Widnes
- Spike Island (Southampton), the area bounded by the River Itchen and River Hamble in Hampshire
- Spike Island, former name for Northumberland Heath, London
- Spike Island railway station, a workman's platform situated off the Great Northern Railway's main line south of Doncaster

== Ireland ==
- Spike Island, County Cork, an island in Cork Harbour, Ireland

== Andaman ==
- Spike Island (Andaman Islands)

== Other ==
- Spike Island (concert), a 1990 concert headlined by the Stone Roses in Widnes, England
- Spike Island (song), a 2025 single by Pulp inspired by the concert
- Spike Island (film), a 2012 British comedy film based on the 1990 concert
- Spike Island Artspace, a centre for contemporary art in Bristol, England
