= M320 Grenade Launcher Module =

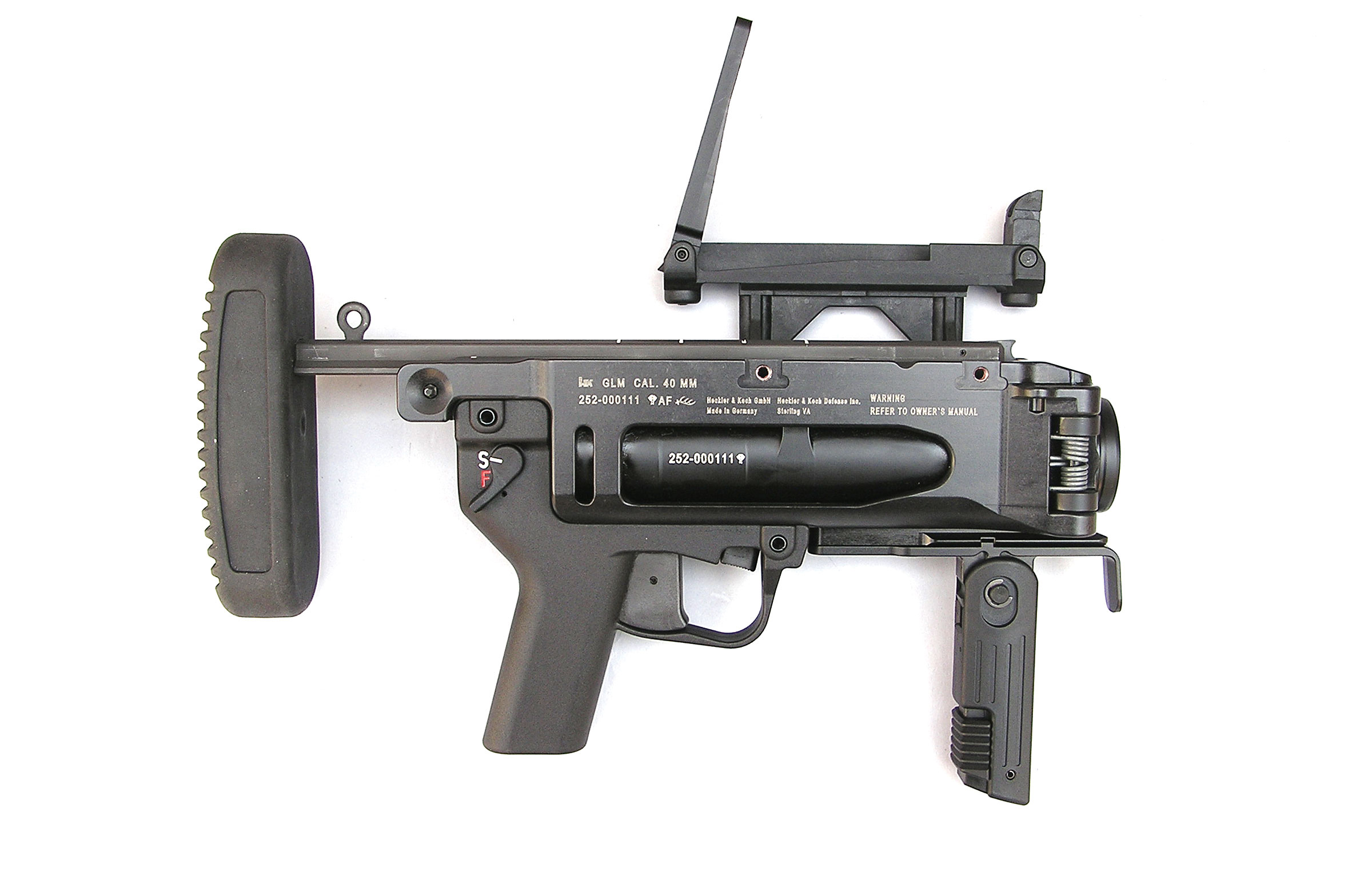
- Standalone M320 with detachable buttstock
- Type: Grenade launcher
- Place of origin: Germany and United States

Service history
- In service: 2009–present
- Used by: See Users
- Wars: Internal conflict in Myanmar; War in Afghanistan (2001–2021); Russian invasion of Ukraine; Gaza war

Production history
- Designed: 2008
- Manufacturer: Heckler & Koch; Capco Inc.
- Unit cost: US$3500
- Produced: 2008
- Variants: M320, M320A1

Specifications
- Mass: 1.5 kg (3.3 lb)
- Length: 350 mm (13.7 in.)
- Barrel length: 280 mm (11 in.)
- Cartridge: 40×46mm SR
- Action: Single-shot, double-action
- Rate of fire: 5 to 7 rounds per minute
- Muzzle velocity: 76 m/s (250 ft/s)
- Effective firing range: 150 m (490 ft) (point); 350 m (1,150 ft) (area)
- Maximum firing range: 400 m (1,300 ft)
- Feed system: Single-shot

M320 Grenade Launcher Module (GLM) is the U.S. military's designation of a single-shot 40 mm grenade launcher system that aimed to replace the M203 for the U.S. Army, while other services initially kept using the older M203. The M320 uses the same High-Low Propulsion System as the M203. The M320 can be mounted on the M16 series of rifles, while the M320A1 can be mounted on the M4 series of carbines.

As of April 2026, the US Army issued a request for a next-generation grenade launcher to replace the M203 and M320.

== History ==
In 2004, the Army announced a requirement for a commercial off-the-shelf 40 mm grenade launcher. It had to be more reliable, ergonomic, accurate, and safe than the M203. It had to be able to fire all 40 mm low-velocity grenades but be loaded from the breech to accept future longer projectiles. Heckler & Koch's submission was selected in May 2005.

After the U.S. Army at Picatinny Arsenal conducted a competitive bidding process for a new 40 mm grenade launching system, Heckler & Koch was awarded a contract to provide the XM320 beginning in 2006. The M320 was developed from but is not identical to the Heckler & Koch AG36 (a key distinguishing feature being the addition of a folding foregrip ahead of the trigger for use when the weapon is in stand-alone configuration, a feature the AG36 lacks). The M320 entered production in November 2008.

Fielding of the M320 was planned to begin in February 2009, with 71,600 GLMs planned to phase out the M203 by 2015. The weapon was officially fielded in July 2009 at Fort Bragg by the 1st Brigade Combat Team, 82nd Airborne Division. In June 2017, Bravo Company, 2nd Combat Engineer Battalion became the first U.S. Marine Corps unit to be issued the M320. Following initial experiments, the Marines expect to issue 7,000 launchers between 2019 and 2022. In the second quarter of fiscal year 2020, the M320A1 reached Initial Operational Capability (IOC) with the U.S. Marine Corps.

As of April 2026, the US Army has issued a request for a next-generation grenade launcher to replace the M203 and M320, referred to as the Precision Grenadier System (PGS).

== Design ==
The M320 can be used in two ways. It can be attached to the M16 assault rifle, ⁣M4 carbine, or HK416 by attaching to the picatinny rail under the barrel forward of the magazine, or it can be used in a stand-alone configuration with a stock attached. A grenadier carrying an M320 with an M4 and three dozen 40 mm grenades will have a total weapon load of 38 lb (17 kg).

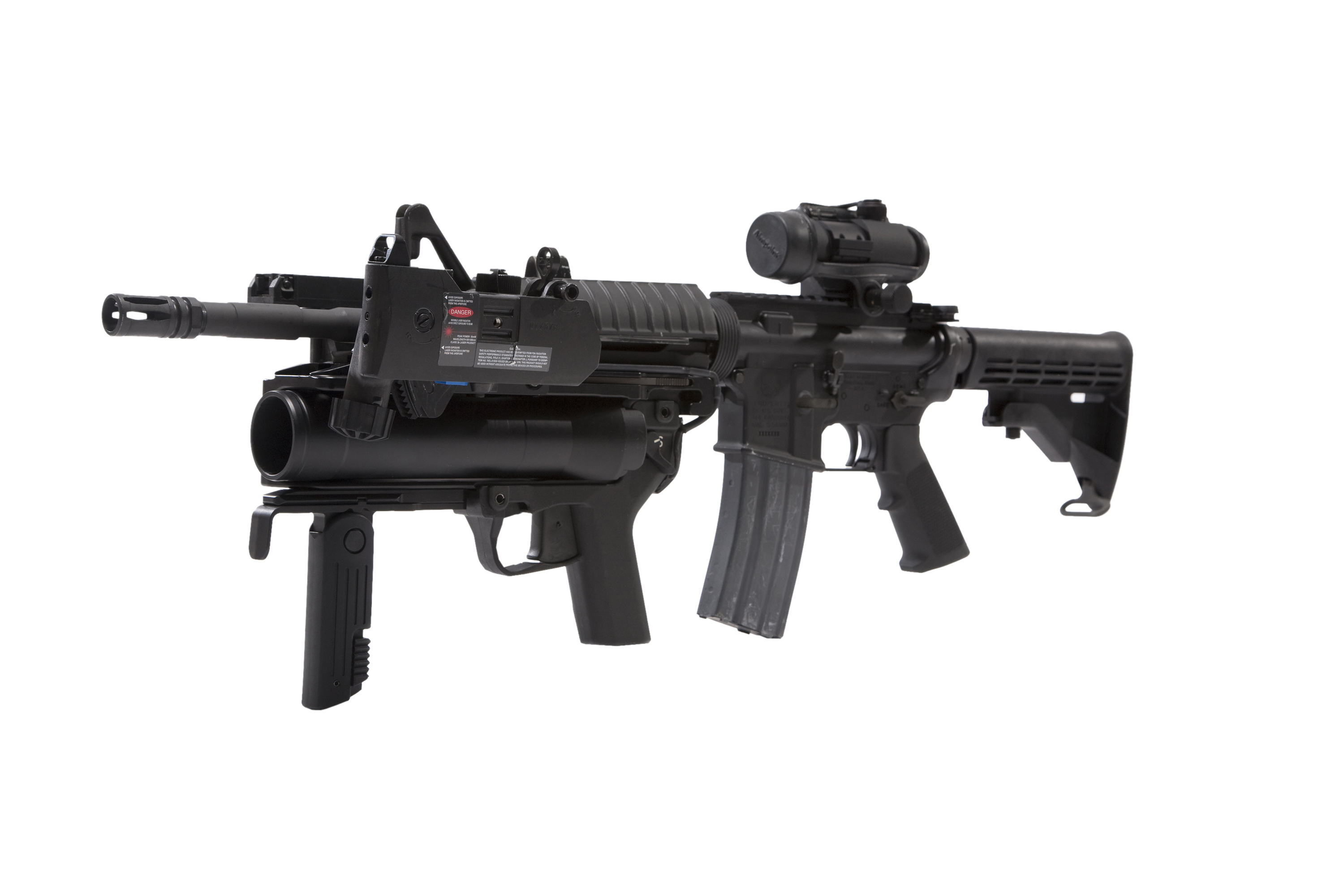
The M320 with AN/PSQ-18A on an M4 carbine

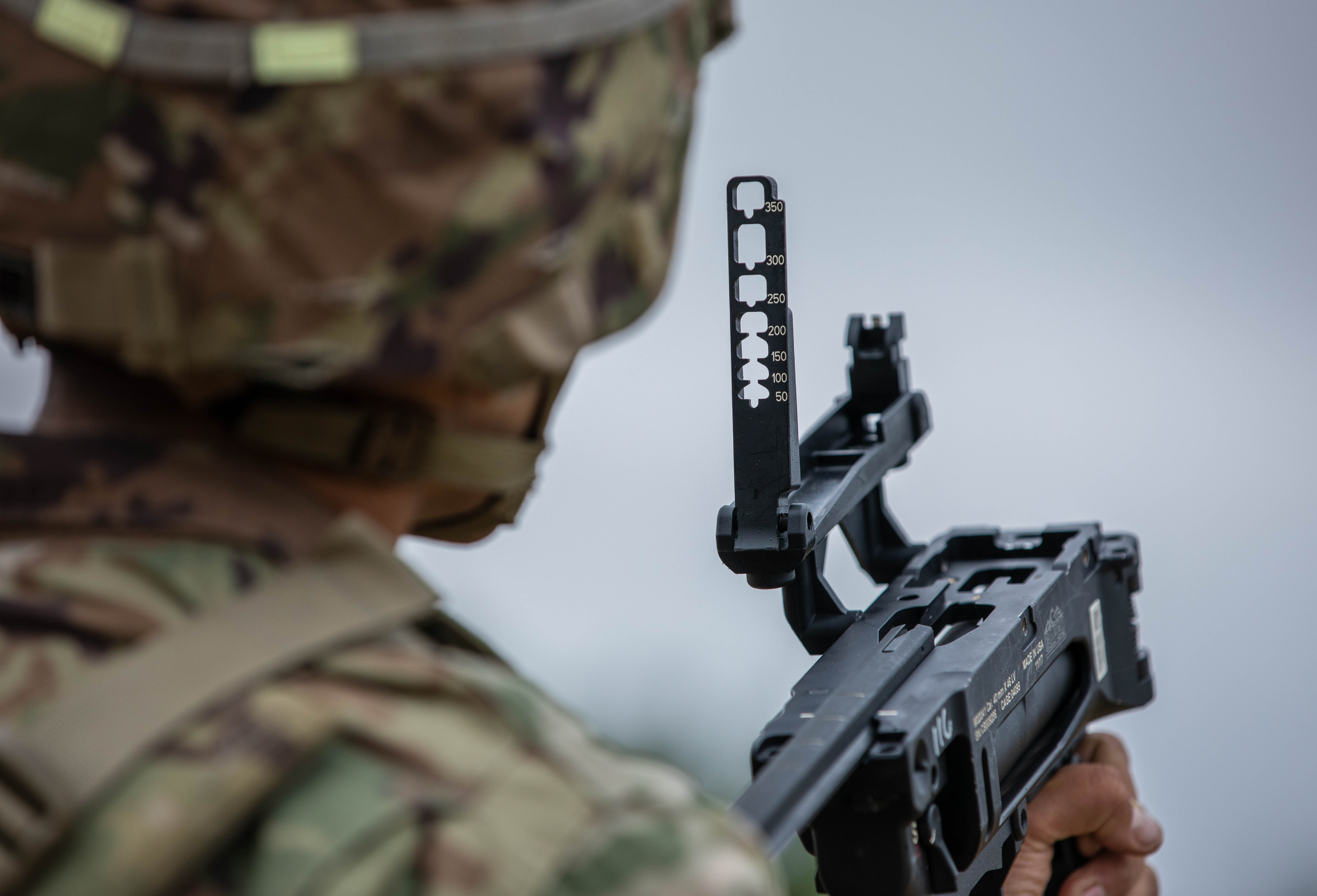
M320A1 Leaf Sight

The M320 is based on the earlier Heckler & Koch AG-C, but with some Army-specific modifications. It includes a folding foregrip and shorter barrel for a more compact package. The sights had to be reconfigured to shoot accurately with the slightly different ballistics from the shorter barrel length. The system was supposed to be lighter than the M203 (it is actually slightly heavier) and does not require specific mounting hardware. Breech loading allows the grenadier to load a shell while keeping the sight on target. It weighs 3.57 lb (1.62 kg) in its base configuration and 4.8 lb (2.2 kg) with the stock attached.

The sights on the M320 are located to the side of the launcher, avoiding the problems that the M203 had with its sight design, which is mounted on top of the launcher and could interfere with the rifle's sights, so they had to be attached separately. This meant two separate operations had to be performed when adding the grenade launcher to the weapon, and since the sights were not integral to the M203, they had to be re-zeroed every time the launcher was reattached to the rifle. The M320's leaf sight has ranges from 50 to 350 meters in 50 meter increments. The M320 could also use the AN/PSQ-18A, which is an enhanced aiming device designed to enable rapid and precise fire in daylight, low light, and night conditions. The device has a built-in range scale, an integrated aiming illuminating laser, an anti-cant indicator, and a built-in iron backup sight. However, the sight was not well received by troops due to its weight and size.

To replace the AN/PSQ-18A, the U.S. Marine Corps and U.S. Army separately adopted their own advanced sighting systems tailored for their needs. The Marine Corps fields the SU-277/PSQ Grenade Launcher Sight (GLS), which features a holographic red dot for improved aiming, integrated ballistic data for automatic adjustment based on ammunition, infrared aiming laser, and a compact, lightweight design. While, the U.S. Army utilizes the Wilcox Grenadier Sighting System (GSS), a day/night sighting solution designed for both under-barrel and stand-alone configurations of the M320. Selected in 2019 after years of development and testing, the GSS incorporates a reflex optical sight with integral backup iron sights, a near-infrared (NIR) aiming laser for night engagements, and an NIR illuminator for increased target recognition and identification. It provides aiming references that correspond to ballistic ranges and features user-selectable ballistic solutions, including a quick selector for two pre-programmed ammunition profiles. Advanced sensors for temperature and pressure enable precise ballistic compensation, while an indicator for left or right tilt, also known as cant, further improves accuracy during firing.

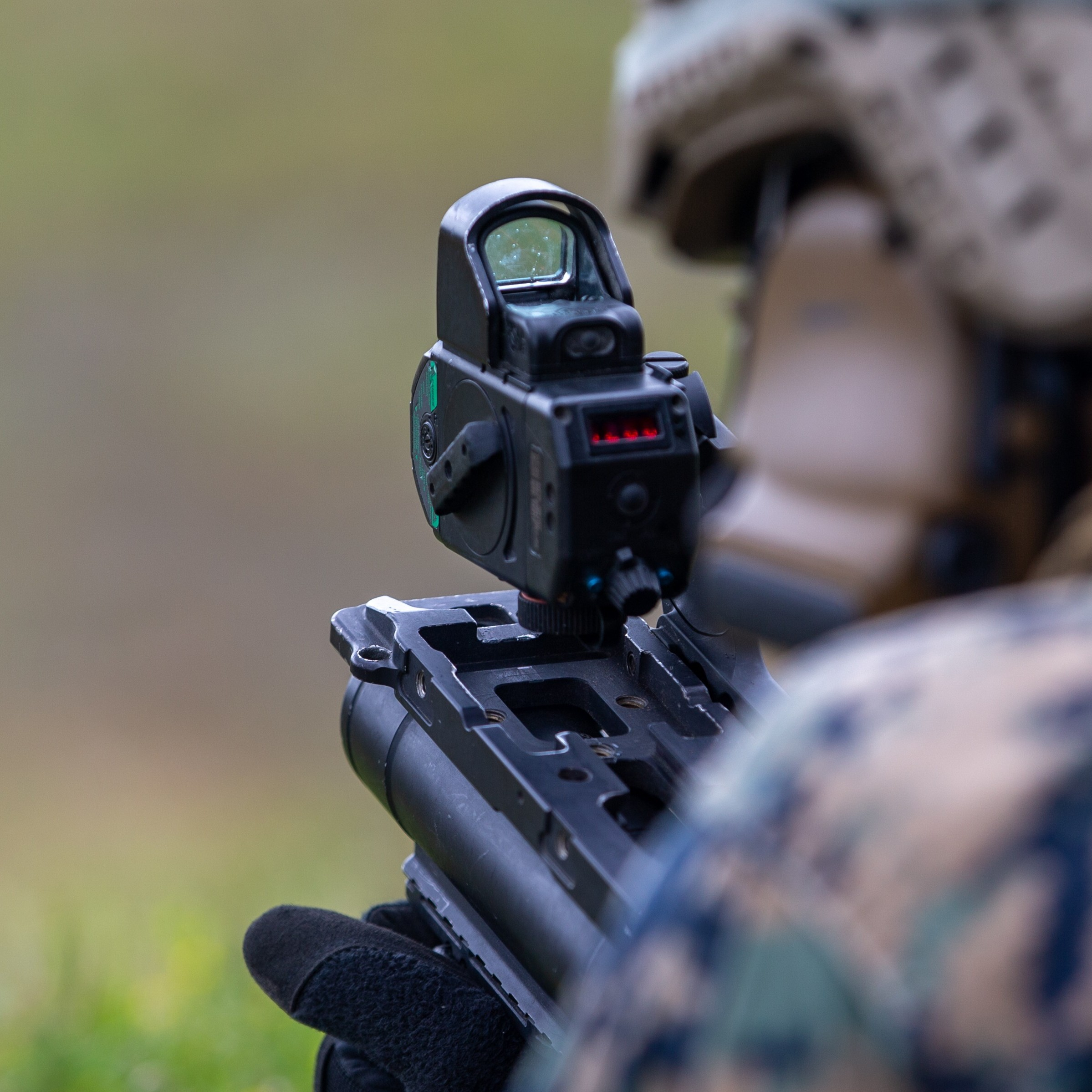
M320A1 with SU-277/PSQ GLS

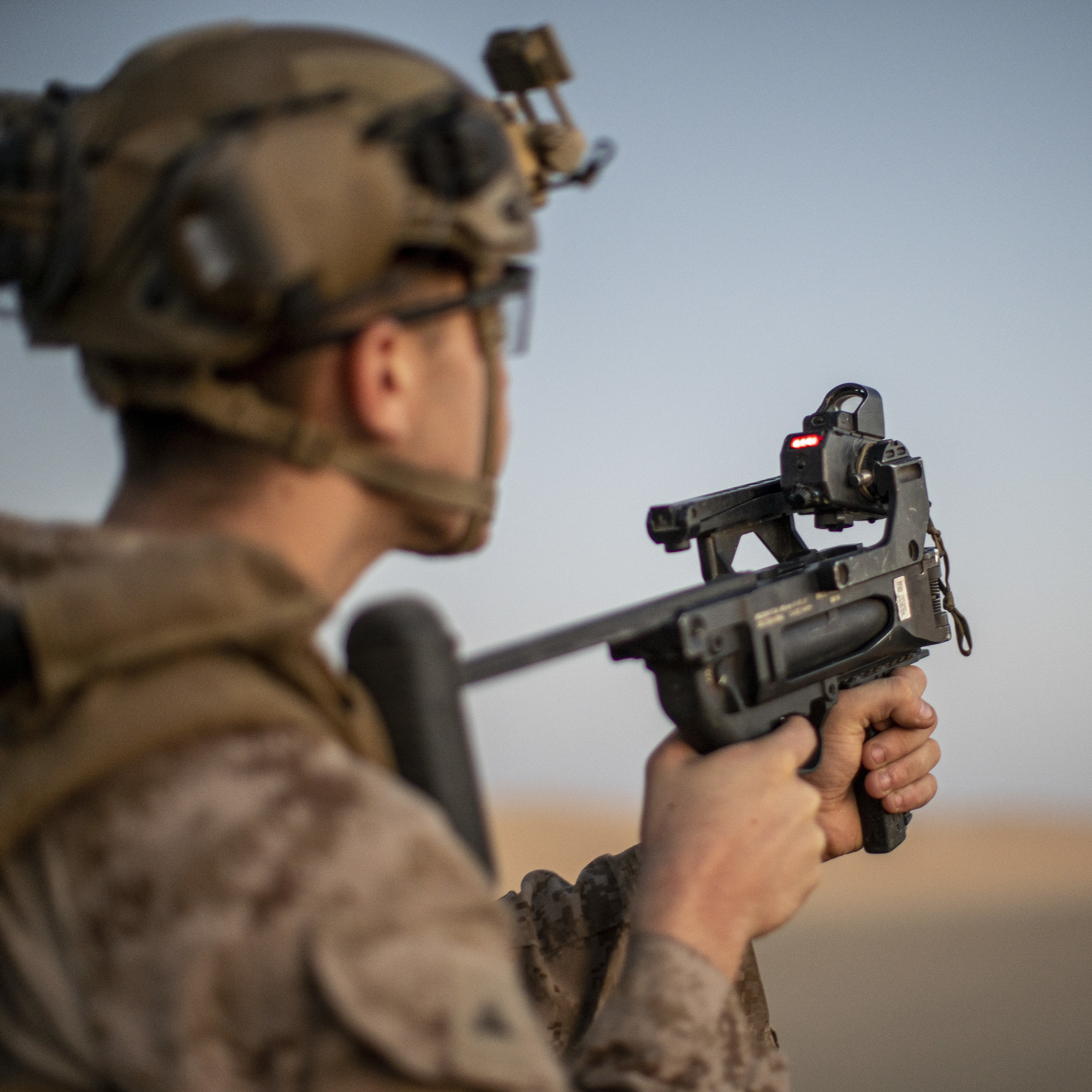
M320A1 with GLS and leaf sight

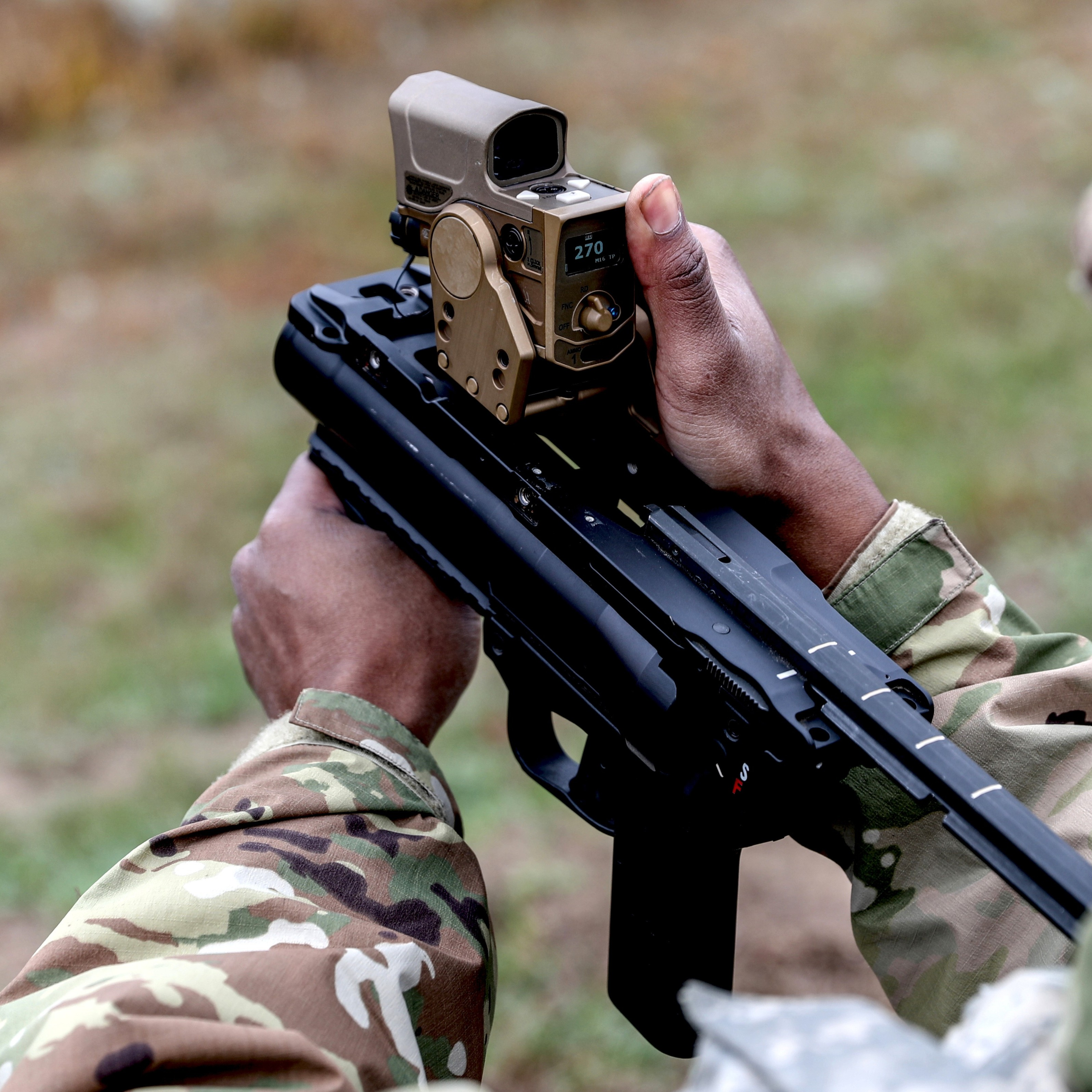
M320A1 with Wilcox GSS

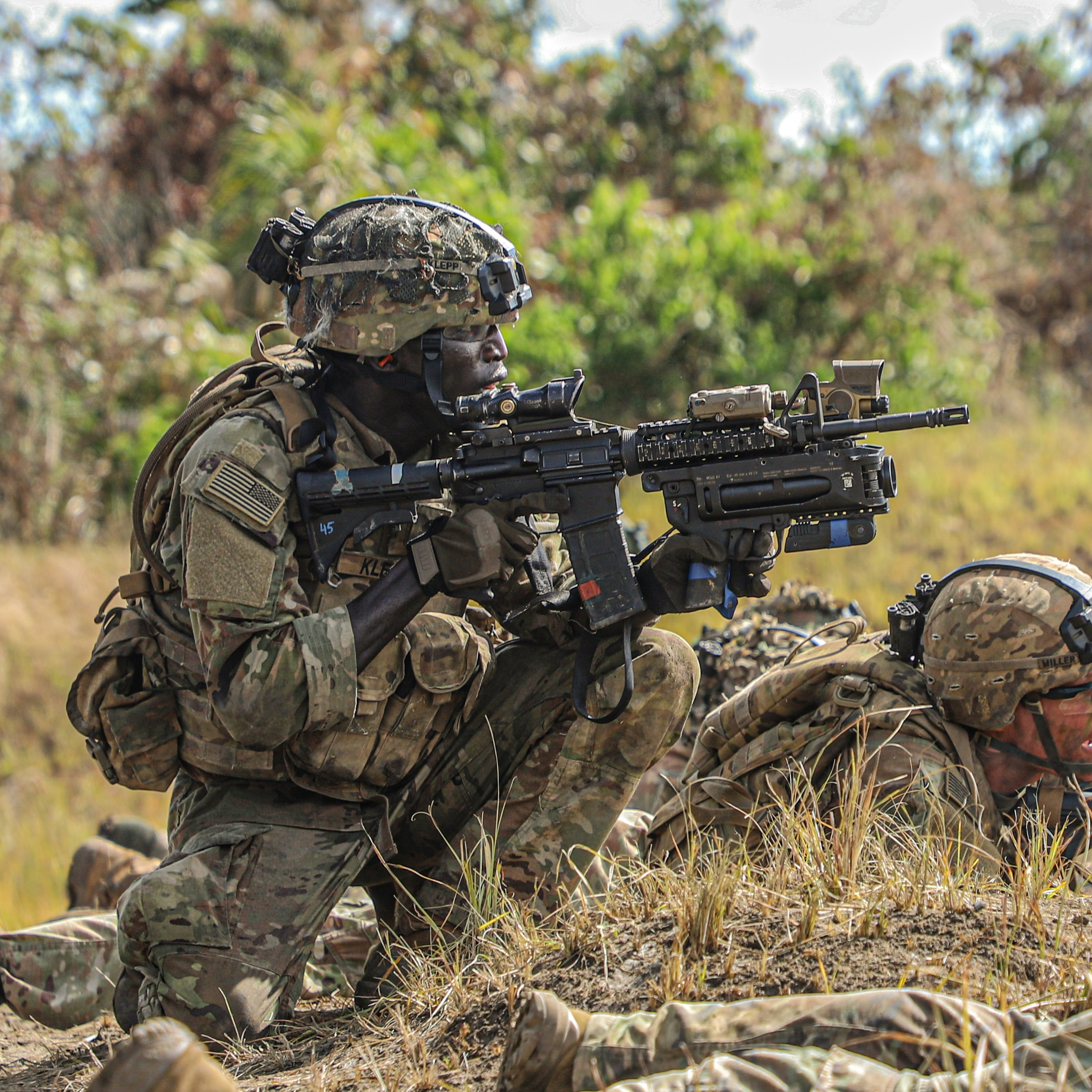
Underslung M320A1 with GSS

The M320 can fire all NATO high-explosive, smoke, and illumination grenades. Its breech opens to the side, allowing it to fire a variety of newer rounds that are longer, in particular certain non-lethal rounds, such as Defense Technology's "eXact iMpact" non-lethal sponge grenades. The M320 operates in double-action mode, with an ambidextrous safety. In case of misfire, the M320 operator merely has to pull the trigger again. The M203 used a single-action mode, which cocks the weapon as the barrel is opened. The M203 operator has to open the barrel by unlocking it and pushing forward to cock the weapon and then re-close the barrel, then pull the trigger again. The problem with this is that in opening the barrel, the grenade is designed to eject and the operator must ensure that it does not fall to the ground.

The M320 is one of two 40 mm grenade launchers capable of firing Pike Missile (developed by Raytheon) without modification—the other being the FN EGLM (Enhanced Grenade Launching Module) developed for the FN SCAR.

Nonetheless, the weapon's introduction was not without criticism:

- Soldiers complained about switching from the simple, more streamlined M203 to one with more sophisticated attachments (although this could be attributed simply to the change from a long-standing "tried and true" system to a new one). Complaints ranged from the forward grip and sighting system, the pistol grip handle catching on things, and the side loading mechanism. They even criticized its ability to act as a stand-alone launcher, a feature included in response to troops re-acquiring Vietnam-era M79 grenade launchers that supposedly gave better accuracy when fired from the shoulder than if slung under a rifle, although the collapsible stock is somewhat short for the task.

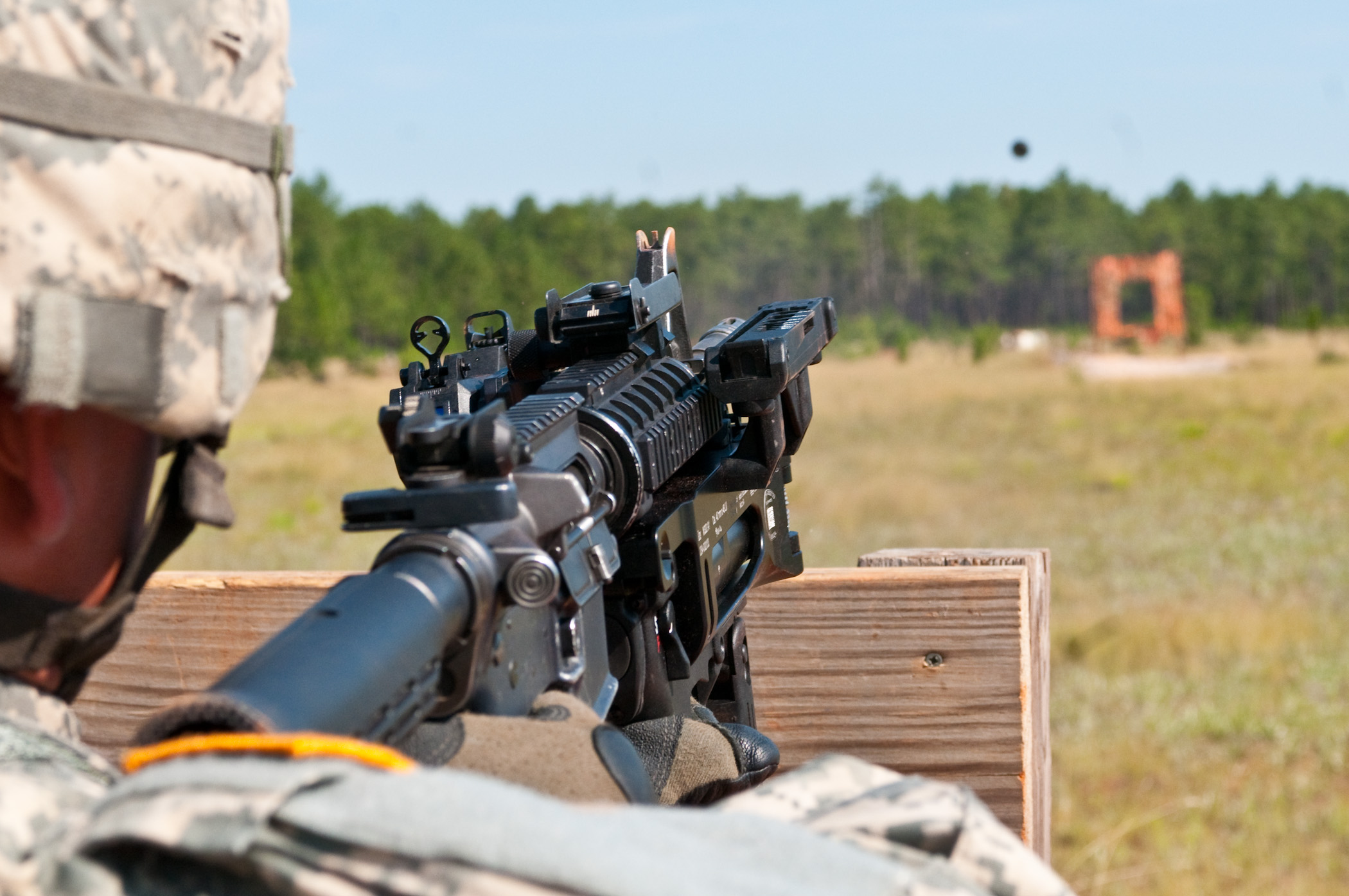
A U.S. Army soldier training with an M320 mounted on an M4 carbine

- The M320 has the ability to fire detached from a rifle. Soldiers have reported difficulties carrying it unmounted, as its one-point sling does not hold it securely. Carrying by the sling would cause it to bounce around and sometimes be dragged through dirt. Soldiers wanted to carry the M320 in a holster to provide protection, rather than just putting it in their rucksack. The Natick Soldier Systems Center began the M320GL Holster Soldier Enhancement Program (SEP) in November 2012. Three commercial vendors produced 167 holsters each. The SEP used the "buy-try-decide" concept, which allows the Army to test the functionality of equipment without spending much time on research and development. Soldiers from the 75th Ranger Regiment were given a dozen holsters and went through standardized tests in mid-May 2013, after which they filled out surveys. The next step was to test them with an entire brigade. As of July 2013, the holsters were being evaluated by soldiers in Afghanistan. Project officials were to make a recommendation to Fort Benning by the beginning of fiscal year 2014.

== Users ==
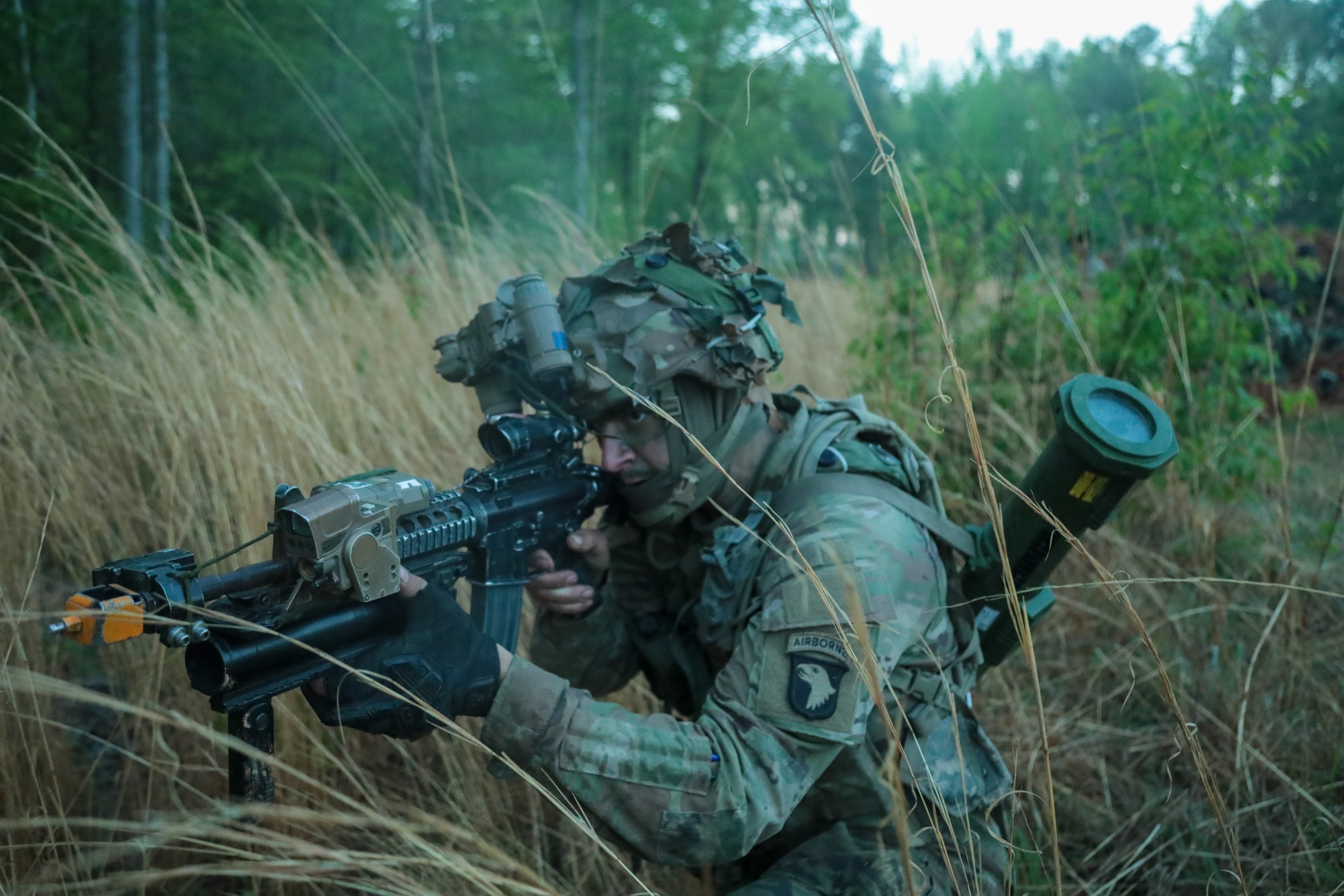
U.S. Army infantryman with an M320A1 underslung on an M4A1 carbine, equipped with a Grenadier Sighting System (GSS)

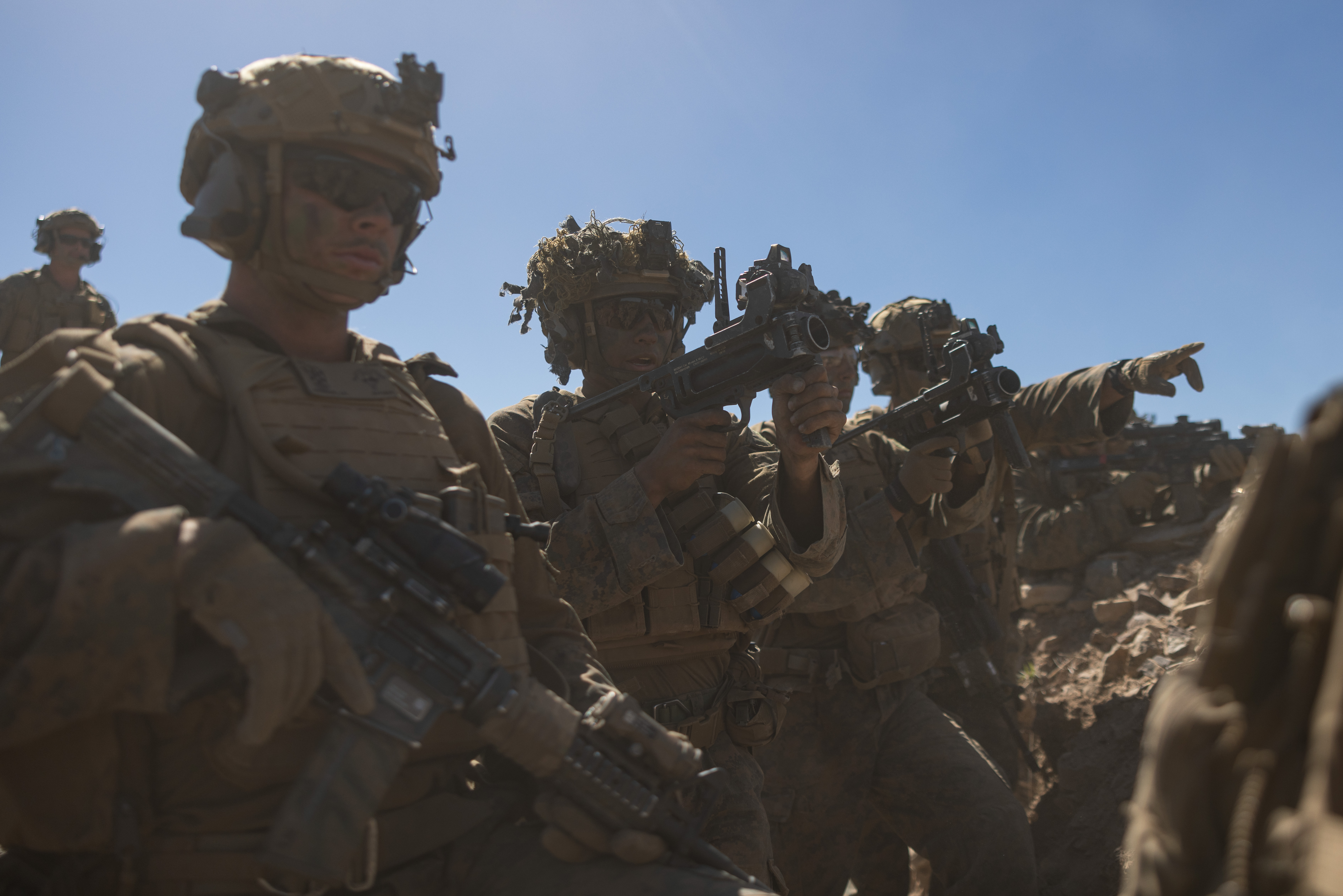
U.S. Marine infantrymen firing M320A1 grenade launchers equipped with the SU-277/PSQ Grenade Launcher Sight (GLS)

- Canada
- Germany
- Kosovo
- Hungary
- Israel
- Malaysia
- Netherlands
- Norway
- Philippines
- Thailand
- Ukraine
  - Ukrainian Ground Forces
  - Ukrainian Marine Corps
- United Kingdom
- United States
  - United States Army
  - United States Marine Corps
  - United States Air Force

=== Non-State Actors ===
- Kachin Independence Army: Uses the KA-series Pading, a clone of the M320.
- People's Defence Force

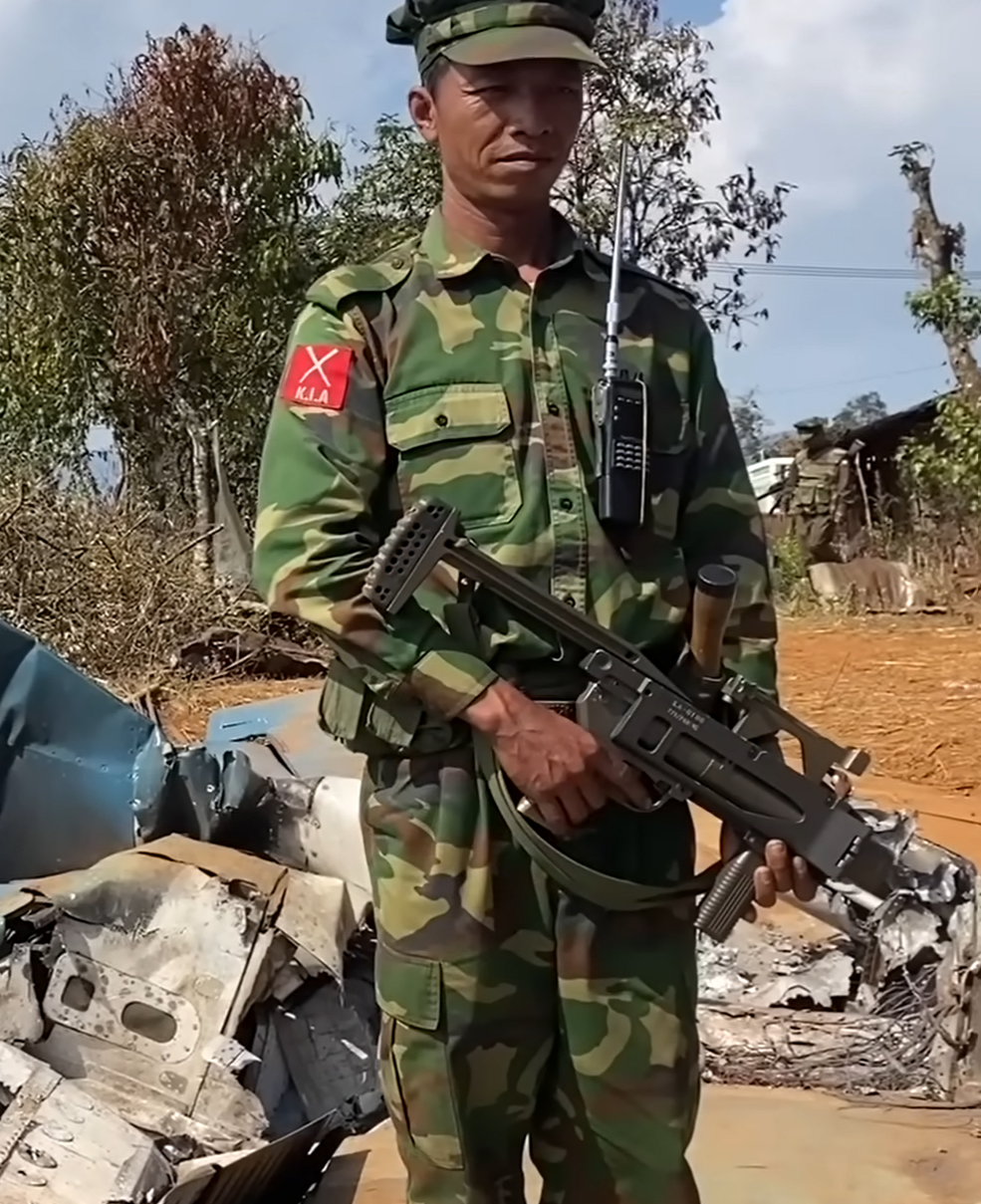
Kachin Independence Army fighter with a KA-series Pading Grenade Launcher next to a crashed Myanmar Air Force FTC-2000.

== See also ==
- AMD-65
- Attached grenade launcher
- Knight's Armament Company Masterkey
- M26 Modular Accessory Shotgun System
- Pike (munition)
- Related lists:
  - List of crew-served weapons of the U.S. Armed Forces
  - List of individual weapons of the U.S. Armed Forces
  - United States 40 mm grenades
- Rifle grenade
- XM25 CDTE
