= List of gun-launched missiles =

Gun-launched missiles, a subset of cannon-launched guided projectiles, are usually anti-tank guided missiles that are fired from tank guns, and sometimes have a claimed limited anti-helicopter capability.

- Chinese GP105 fired from 105 mm gun
- French Anti-Char Rapide Autopropulsé (ACRA) 142mm anti-tank guided missile, tested on a version of the AMX-30 MBT
- Indian SAMHO fired from 120 mm gun
- Israeli LAHAT, used with their 105 and 120 mm gun tubes
- Russian 9K112 Kobra (AT-8 Songster), 9M119 Svir/Refleks (AT-11 Sniper) and other types fired from 125 mm guns, and 9M117 Bastion fired from 100 mm guns and 115 mm guns
- Turkish TANOK is a 120 mm gun-launched laser-guided anti-tank missile developed by Roketsan.
- Ukrainian / Belgian Falarick 105 tandem warhead by John Cockerill (CMI Defence) and Luch Design Bureau, to be fired from the Cockerill CV 105 mm gun.
- Ukrainian Falarick 120
- Ukrainian Falarick 90
- Ukrainian Kombat tandem-warhead ATGM with a 5,000 m effective range, fired from a 125 mm smoothbore gun
- US Army MGM-51 Shillelagh fired from a 152 mm gun
- XM1111 Mid-Range Munition (guided round, no rocket motor)

== See also ==
- Missile tank
- Guided Multipurpose Munition
