= Spyker (disambiguation) =

Spyker may refer to:

- Spyker, a former Dutch car manufacturer
- Spyker Cars, a modern Dutch car manufacturer
- Spyker F1, a former Formula One team created by Spyker Cars
- Spyker, a village in Germany; see Glowe

== See also ==
- Spiker (disambiguation)
