= Spiked =

Spiked may refer to:

- A drink to which alcohol, recreational drugs, or a date rape drug has been added
  - Spiked seltzer, seltzer with alcohol
  - Mickey Finn (drugs), a drink laced with a drug
- Spiked (hairstyle), hairstyles featuring spikes
- Spiked (magazine), a British Internet-based magazine
- Spike*D, stage name of German DJ Marcel Stephan, part of German DJ duo Gestört aber GeiL
- Spiked (film), a film starring Aidan Quinn
- Spiked!, a Hardy Boys novel
- "Spiked" (Doctors), a 2004 television episode

== See also ==
- Spike (disambiguation)
- The dictionary definition of Spicata at Wiktionary
