= Arnaud de Borchgrave =

American journalist

- Arnaud de Borchgrave receiving the Legion of Honour in July 2014
- Born: Count Arnaud Charles Paul Marie Philippe de Borchgrave; 26 October 1926; Brussels, Belgium
- Died: 15 February 2015 (aged 88); Washington, D.C., U.S.
- Resting place: Rock Creek Cemetery; Washington, D.C., U.S.
- Known for: International journalism
- Relatives: Sir Charles Townshend (grandfather); Count Louis Cahen d'Anvers (great-grandfather); George Townshend, 1st Marquess Townshend (4x great-grandfather)
- Honours: National Order of the Legion of Honour
- Military career
- Allegiance: United Kingdom
- Branch: Royal Navy
- Service years: 1942–1946
- Conflicts: Second World War
- Awards: Médaille Maritime; Legion of Honour – Knight (2014)

Arnaud Charles Paul Marie Philippe de Borchgrave (26 October 1926 – 15 February 2015) was a Belgian–American journalist who specialized in international politics. Following a long career with the news magazine Newsweek, covering 17 wars in 30 years as a foreign correspondent, he held key editorial and executive positions with The Washington Times and United Press International. Borchgrave was also a founding member of Newsmax Media.

== Early life and education ==
de Borchgrave family's coat of arms

Borchgrave was born in Brussels into the De Borchgrave d'Altena family. He was the son of Belgian Count Baudouin de Borchgrave d'Altena, later head of military intelligence for the Belgian government in exile during World War II, and his British wife Audrey Dorothy Louise Townshend. His mother was the daughter of Major General Sir Charles Townshend and his French wife, Alice Cahen d'Anvers, who appeared in a notable 1881 portrait alongside her sister in Pierre-Auguste Renoir's Pink and Blue. His maternal great-grandfather was Count Louis Cahen d'Anvers, a prominent French banker. He was a descendant of Field Marshal George Townshend, 1st Marquess Townshend, through his second son, Lord John Townshend.

Borchgrave was educated in Belgium, at King's Canterbury in England, and in the United States.

In 1940, as Belgium fell to Nazi Germany's invasion, he and his family escaped on a freighter, and were rescued by a British destroyer after the freighter's captain had attempted to divert to Hamburg.

== Career ==
=== Royal Navy ===
From 1942 to 1946, during much of World War II, Borchgrave served in the British Royal Navy. He enrolled at age 15, after running away from home and convincing his grandmother to assist in falsifying his age so he could enlist. He was awarded the Maritime Medal by Belgium.

=== Journalism ===
==== Newsweek ====
In 1947, Borchgrave was appointed as the Brussels bureau manager for United Press, and in 1950 he became Newsweek's bureau chief in Paris, and then its chief correspondent. In 1951, he gave up his Belgian title of nobility in 1951.

In 1953, he became a senior editor for the magazine. Osborn Elliott, former editor-in-chief of Newsweek, once said:

De Borchgrave has played a role in world affairs known to no other journalist. He has been able to tap the thinking of numerous world leaders... despite his intimacy with major policymakers, he has never aligned himself with either side of a dispute.... Arnaud de Borchgrave has made significant contributions to world peace and understanding.

As a correspondent for Newsweek, Borchgrave secured several interviews with world leaders. In 1969, he interviewed both President Gamal Abdel Nasser of Egypt and Prime Minister Levi Eshkol of Israel.

In October 1972, during the Vietnam War, he travelled to Hanoi to interview Prime Minister and Politburo member Pham Van Dong in North Vietnam. In that interview, Dong described a provision of a proposed peace deal as a "coalition of transition," which raised fears in South Vietnam that the deal involved a coalition government and may have played a role in South Vietnam's rejection of the deal.

In 1980, Borchgrave co-authored The Spike, a novel, with Robert Moss.

==== The Washington Times and UPI ====
In March 1985, he was appointed editor-in-chief of The Washington Times, and went on to serve in the late 1990s as CEO of a much-diminished United Press International, the successor to his early-career employer, during the latter part of the agency's ownership by a group of Saudi investors. In that role, Borchgrave orchestrated UPI's exit from its last major media niche, the broadcast news business that United Press had initiated in the 1930s.

He maintained that "what was brilliant pioneering work on the part of UPI prior to World War II, with radio news, is now a static quantity and so far as I'm concerned, certainly doesn't fit into my plans for the future." He sought to shift UPI's dwindling resources into Internet-based delivery of newsletter services, focusing more on technical and diplomatic specialties than on general news. The rump UPI thus sold their client list of its still-significant radio network and broadcast wire to its former rival, the AP.

The following year, Borchgrave played a key role in the sale of the further downsized UPI to News World Communications, the international news media company founded in 1976 by Unification Church leader Sun Myung Moon, who was also the founder of The Washington Times for which Borchgrave had worked earlier.

After his CEO turn at UPI, Borchgrave became "Editor-at-Large" of The Washington Times and UPI, writing regular columns published by either or both and retaining associations with both Unification Church-owned media outlets. He also served as Project Director for Transnational Threats and Senior Advisor at the Center for Strategic and International Studies. He was a contributor to The Globalist, a daily online magazine.

According to Flashback, a 1990 book by Morley Safer, Borchgrave testified before Senator Jeremiah Denton's subcommittee in 1981 that Pham Xuan An, a Time employee and Viet Cong spy based in Saigon, "was an agent whose mission was to disinform the Western press". An denied to Safer that he planted disinformation, saying that his Viet Cong bosses thought it would be too obvious and that they preferred he feed them information instead.

Borchgrave was a founding member of Newsmax Media. He also belonged to the Foreign Policy Association, occasionally appearing as a panelist in their videos and events.

As a journalist, Borchgrave interviewed many heads of state, heads of government, monarchs, and key figures of the world, including Mullah Omar, who he interviewed with UPI international consultant Ammar Turabi three months prior to the September 11 attacks. The interview offered insight for decision and policy makers globally and has been published in several print media multiple times since the 2001 attacks, and UPI considers the interview, the only one ever conducted with Omar, one of its best achievements, including it in UPI's 100 Years of Excellence.

==== Plagiarism allegations ====
On 17 May 2012, Erik Wemple, a blogger for The Washington Post, reported that Borchgrave's columns in The Washington Times reflected his think tank work at the Center for Strategic and International Studies (CSIS), and raised questions about the originality of some of his writing, citing similarities between elements of his columns and other published material. Wemple included Borchgrave's explanations for those, but also the doubts expressed about the similarities by some of the other organizations involved. Elsewhere, the news website Salon reported that anonymous Washington Times officials claimed that the paper had known about Borchgrave's plagiarism nearly a year before Wemple's investigation and had initially discontinued his column before resuming it without any disciplinary action.

Borchgrave denied the allegations and claimed that his column was suspended because he was on book leave. The Washington Times then announced that Borchgrave would take a hiatus to complete work on his memoirs while the paper conducted an inquiry into his work. Some of Borchgrave's latest columns were removed from the Washington Times website. CSIS conducted its own investigation of work Borchgrave had published under its name.

== French Legion of Honor award ==
In July 2014, Borchgrave was awarded a knighthood in France's the Legion of Honour.

== In media ==
Borchgrave has been featured on several TV and Internet shows, including Weekend World, The Bob Braun Show, The Tonight Show Starring Johnny Carson, The McLaughlin Group, Paula Zahn Now, and James Goodale's Digital Age on WNYE-TV.

He appeared as himself in a 1984 United States Information Agency report titled Soviet Active Measures.

== Personal life ==
In 1969, following two earlier marriages, Borchgrave married Alexandra Villard, daughter of the ambassador and author Henry Serrano Villard. Together with John Cullen, Alexandra published a biography of Henry Villard, a railroad tycoon and her great-grandfather.

== Death ==
Borchgrave died of bladder cancer in Washington, D.C. on February 15, 2015, at the age of 88. He was a member of the Metropolitan Club of Washington D.C.

== Publications ==
=== Books ===
- The Spike (1980), with Robert Moss. New York: Crown Publishers. ISBN 0517536242.
- Monimbó (1963), with Robert Moss. New York: Simon and Schuster. ISBN 978-0671508005.

=== Reports ===
- Cyber Threats and Information Security: Meeting the 21st Century Challenge (May 2001). Washington, D.C.: Center for Strategic International Studies. OCLC 46670960.

== See also ==
- Legion of Honour
- Legion of Honour Museum
- List of Legion of Honour recipients by name (A)
- Ribbons of the French military and civil awards
