= Spike (surname) =

Spike is the surname of:

- John Spike (born 1951), American art historian, curator and author
- Michèle Kahn Spike, American lawyer, historian, and prominent lay figure in the Episcopalian church
- Paul Spike, American author, editor and journalist
- Robert W. Spike (1923–1966), American clergyman, theologian and civil rights leader

== See also ==
- Spike (nickname)
- Spikes (surname)
