= Robert Moss =

Australian journalist and writer (born 1946)

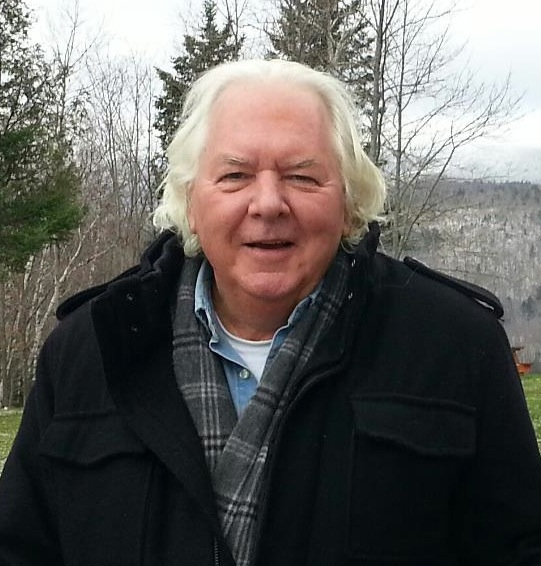
Moss in December 2012

Robert Moss (born in 1946) is a journalist and author who has written suspense novels and works on dreaming.

== Early life and education ==
Moss was born in 1945 in Melbourne, Australia. As a child, Moss suffered several serious illnesses.

Moss attended Scotch College, Melbourne and Canberra Grammar School and then Australian National University (ANU), where he received a Bachelor of Arts with 1st class honours and the University Prize in History in 1967. He then received a Master's Degree in history from ANU. Following his education, he became a lecturer in ancient history at the ANU in 1969–1970.

In 1970, Moss began Ph.D. research at University College London before discontinuing it to pursue a career in journalism.

== Career ==
Moss joined the editorial staff of The Economist, where he was an editorial writer and special correspondent from 1970 to 1980, reporting from some 35 countries. He edited The Economist's weekly Foreign Report from 1974 to 1980, and wrote for many other publications, including The Daily Telegraph, The New York Times Magazine, The New Republic and Commentary. He was a regular commentator on international affairs on British television and the BBC World Service.

In a paper presented to the International Institute for Strategic Studies in 1971 on the emergence of international terrorism. He expanded his paper into his first book, Urban Guerrillas, published in 1971. From 1971 to 1980, he was a visiting lecturer at the Royal College of Defence Studies in London. Moss drafted a speech for Margaret Thatcher in January 1976 which warned about the Soviet military build-up. In response to this speech Thatcher was labelled the "Iron Lady" by the Soviet Army newspaper Red Star.

He was awarded the Freedom Prize of the Max Schmidheiny Foundation at the University of St. Gallen in 1979.

Moss co-authored the novel The Spike with Arnaud de Borchgrave; it became a best seller in 1980. Moss then became a full-time writer and published several suspense novels including Moscow Rules and Carnival of Spies.

In 1986, Moss left this work as an author behind and moved to a farm in Upstate New York, where he started dreaming in a language he did not know that he claimed was an archaic form of the Mohawk language. Assisted by native speakers to interpret his dreams, Moss came to believe that they had put him in touch with an ancient healer – a woman of power – and that they were calling him to a different life.

Out of these encounters, he wrote a number of novels and created a technique he terms "active dreaming", which combines modern dreamwork with journeying and healing techniques. A central premise of Moss's approach is that dreaming isn't just what happens during sleep; dreaming is waking up to sources of guidance, healing and creativity beyond the reach of the everyday mind. His first speech on the topic was at the conference of the International Association for the Study of Dreams (IASD) at the University of Leiden in 1994.

Moss's description of the core techniques of active dreaming is:

- Quick dream-sharing (using a "lightning dreamwork" process) and using an "if it were my dream" protocol so that the dreamer is always the final authority on his or her dream.
- Making a conscious journey back inside a dream in order to clarify information, dialogue with a dream character, or move beyond nightmare terrors into healing and resolution.
- Conscious dream travel on an agreed itinerary by two or more partners, often supported by shamanic drumming.
- Reading coincidence and "symbolic pop-ups" in ordinary life as "everyday oracles".

== Personal life ==
Moss married his first wife, Katrina Fairbairn in 1968. They had two daughters, Pandora Moss (born 1971) and Candida Moss (born 1978), and divorced in 1982. He is currently married to Marcia H. Moss, with whom he has a third daughter, Sophie Moss.

== Publications ==
=== Politics ===
Articles

- "International Terrorism and Western Societies". International Journal, Vol. 28, No. 3, Revolution, Summer 1973, pp. 418–430. doi:10.2307/40201138. JSTOR 40201138.

Books

- Urban Guerrilla Warfare. International Institute for Strategic Studies, 1971.
- Urban Guerrillas: The New Face of Political Violence. Maurice Temple Smith, 1972.
- Spain: Between Past and Present. Economist Brief Books, 1972.
- The War for the Cities. New York: Coward, McCann & Geoghegan, 1972. ISBN 0698104498 / ISBN 978-0698104495.
- Chile's Marxist Experiment. David & Charles, 1973.
- The Collapse of Democracy. Maurice Temple Smith, 1975.

Reports

- Urban Guerrillas in Latin America. Institute for the Study of Conflict, 1970.

=== Suspense Novels ===
- The Spike (with Arnaud de Borchgrave) (Crown, 1980)
- Death Beam (Crown, 1981)
- Monimbó (with Arnaud de Borchgrave) (Simon and Schuster, 1983)
- Moscow Rules (Villard, 1985)
- Carnival of Spies (Villard, 1987)
- Mexico Way (Simon and Schuster, 1990)

=== Historical Fiction ===
- The Firekeeper: A Narrative of the New York Frontier. (New Edition, Excelsior/SUNY Press, 2009.)
- Fire Along the Sky: Being the Adventures of Captain Shane Hardacre in the New World. (New Edition, Excelsior/SUNY Press, 2010.)
- The Interpreter: A Story of Two Worlds New York. (New Edition, Excelsior/SUNY Press, 2012.)

=== Active Dreaming ===
- Conscious Dreaming (Three Rivers Press, 1996.
- Dream Gates: A Journey into Active Dreaming (audio; Sounds True, 1999.)
- Dreaming True (Pocket Books, 2000.)
- Dreamways of the Iroquois (Destiny Books, 2004.)
- The Way of the Dreamer (video series; Psyche Productions, 2004.)
- The Dreamer's Book of the Dead (Destiny Books, 2005.)
- The Three "Only" Things: Tapping the Power of Dreams, Coincidence and Imagination (New World Library, 2007.)
- The Secret History of Dreaming (New World Library, 2009.)
- Dreamgates: An Explorer's Guide to the Worlds of Soul, Imagination and Life Beyond Death (Second Edition, New World Library, 2010.)
- Active Dreaming. (New World Library, 2011.)
- Dreaming the Soul Back Home. Shamanic Dreaming for Healing and Becoming Whole. (New World Library, 2012.)
- Here, Everything Is Dreaming: Poems and Stories. (Excelsior/SUNY Press, April 2013).
- The Boy Who Died and Came Back: Adventures of a Dream Archaeologist in the Multiverse. (New World Library, March 2014.)
- Sidewalk Oracles: Playing with Signs, Symbols and Synchronicity in Everyday Life (New World Library, October 2015)
- Mysterious Realities: A Dream Traveler's Tales from the Imaginal Realm (New World Library, October 2018)
- Growing Big Dreams: Manifesting Your Heart’s Desires through Twelve Secrets of the Imagination (New World Library, September 2020)
- Wings for the Journey (Shamanic Drumming; Psyche Productions)
