= Spike Island railway station =

Railway station in Doncaster, England

Spike Island (Doncaster)

General information
- Location: Doncaster, Doncaster; England
- Coordinates: 53.50289°N 1.11875°W
- Grid reference: SE585010

Other information
- Status: Disused
Location

Spike Island was a workman's platform situated off the Great Northern Railway's mainline some 1 3/4 miles (2.8 km) south of Doncaster, England, by the Carr Wagon Shops. It was situated off the Down Goods Line and was served by a passenger train, running non-stop, under express headlights, known as the Spike Island Flyer. This brought staff from the main station to work in the wagon shops and returned them in the evening. The locomotive was the J52 which worked the wagon shop sidings during the day. The works closed in the early 1960s, production being moved to the plant works.

The name "Spike Island" was given to the area around the wagon shops but its origins are unclear.
