= Maritime Medal 1940–1945 =

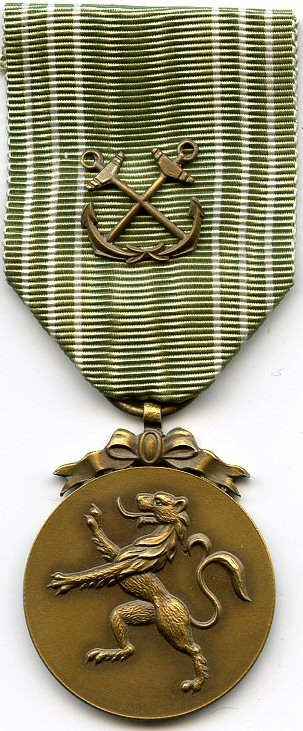
- Maritime Medal 1940–1945 (obverse)
- Type: War medal
- Awarded for: Heroism in saving a ship or lives at sea during the Second World War
- Presented by: Kingdom of Belgium
- Eligibility: Belgian citizens
- Status: No longer awarded
- Established: 17 July 1941
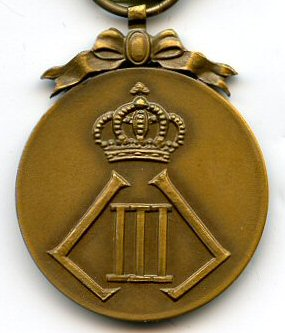
- Reverse

The Maritime Medal 1940–1945 (French: Médaille Maritime 1940–1945, Dutch: Maritieme Medaille 1940–1945) was a Belgian bravery award of World War II, established by Royal Decree on 17 July 1941 and awarded to members of the Belgian Navy, merchant navy or fishing fleet for acts of heroism in the saving of ships or lives during an action against the enemy.

The award's statute was later amended to include all naval personnel for service of two years or more aboard an allied warship (most often aboard a Royal Navy ship) and to those who had been shipwrecked twice due to combat actions.

== Award description ==
The Maritime Medal 1940–1945 is a 38mm in diameter circular bronze medal. Its obverse bears the relief image of a "lion rampant". On the reverse, the royal cypher of King Leopold III. Atop the medal, the suspension loop is in the form of a ribbon with a bow.

The medal is suspended by a ring through the suspension loop from a 38mm wide ocean green silk moiré ribbon. There are six 1mm wide white stripes, three at left and three at right separated by 3mm each starting 3mm from the ribbon's edges. Miniature crossed bronze sea anchors are affixed to the ribbon, sizes vary greatly depending on maker.

== Notable recipients (partial list) ==
The individuals listed below were awarded the Maritime Medal 1940–1945:

- Divisional Admiral Léon Lurquin
- Aviator Vice Admiral Sir André Schlim
- Commodore Georges Timmermans
- Captain Henri Teugels
- Seaman 1st class Maurice Mommens
- Seaman AB Leopold-Gaspard Sabbe +08.05.1995

== See also ==
- Orders, decorations, and medals of Belgium
- HMS Godetia and Buttercup

== Other sources ==
- Quinot H., 1950, Recueil illustré des décorations belges et congolaises, 4e Edition. (Hasselt)
- Cornet R., 1982, Recueil des dispositions légales et réglementaires régissant les ordres nationaux belges. 2e Ed. N.pl., (Brussels)
- Borné A.C., 1985, Distinctions honorifiques de la Belgique, 1830–1985 (Brussels)
