= Spikes (surname) =

Spikes is the surname of:

- Brandon Spikes (born 1987), American National Football League (NFL) linebacker
- Cameron Spikes (born 1976), American former NFL football guard
- Charlie Spikes (born 1951), Major League Baseball player
- Irving Spikes (born 1970), American former NFL running back
- Jack Spikes (born 1937), former American collegiate and American Football League running back and placekicker
- John Spikes (1881–1955), American jazz musician and entrepreneur
- Ken Spikes (1935-2009), former NASCAR Cup Series driver
- Reb Spikes (1888–1982), American jazz saxophonist and entrepreneur
- Richard Spikes (1884–1962), African-American engineer
- Takeo Spikes (born 1976), American NFL linebacker

== See also ==
- Spike (surname)
