= Spike the Bulldog =

Spike the Bulldog may refer to:

- Spike the Bulldog (mascot), the official mascot of Gonzaga University
- Spike Bulldog, an English Bulldog from the Tom and Jerry film series
- Spike the Bulldog (Warner Brothers), a gray bulldog who wears a red sweater and a brown bowler hat who appears in the Warner Brothers Looney Tunes and Merrie Melodies series of cartoons
- Spike, later renamed Butch, a character from Tex Avery's cartoons
