= Spiker (surname) =

Spiker is a surname. Notable people with the surname include:

- A. J. Spiker (born 1979), Chairman of the Republican Party of Iowa
- Fred Spiker (born 1957), American actor
- John Spiker (born 1981), American musician
- Olivia Spiker (born 1981), Polish-German female amateur boxer
- Zach Spiker (born 1976), American college basketball coach
