= Spike (character) =

Spike may refer to any of the following fictional characters:

== Dogs ==
- Spike (Peanuts), Snoopy's brother
- Spike (Tom and Jerry), Tom's nemesis in the cartoon series Tom and Jerry
- Spike the Bulldog, a character in the Warner Bros. Looney Tunes and Merrie Melodies series of cartoons
- Spike (Rugrats), Tommy's adoptive dog from Nickelodeon's Rugrats
- Spike, Heathcliff's nemesis in the comic strip and animated series Heathcliff
- Spike, a dog in the My Little Pony: Equestria Girls media franchise

== Video game enemies ==
- Spike, a main playable character in the Ape Escape video game series
- Spike (Mario), a recurring enemy in the Mario games, debuting in Super Mario Bros. 3
  - Foreman Spike, an enemy in the NES video game Wrecking Crew
- Spike, a boss enemy in the video game Spyro: Year of the Dragon

== Dragons ==
- One of three dragons featured in the My Little Pony animated television franchise:
  - Spike (generation 1), a lavender dragon in the original My Little Pony series
  - Spike (generation 3), a blue dragon who first appeared in My Little Pony: The Princess Promenade
  - Spike (generation 4), a purple and green dragon in My Little Pony: Friendship Is Magic

== Other ==
- Spike, Ace Ventura's monkey
- Spike, an anthropomorphic Triceratops in Extreme Dinosaurs
- Spike (Dinosaurs), a character in the Dinosaurs TV series
- Spike, alien pet of Roger Wilco in the video game Space Quest V: The Next Mutation
- Spike, a porcupine from the movie Over the Hedge
- Spike, a female robot in Jeanette Winterson's 2007 novel The Stone Gods
- Spike, a fairy in Disney’s Secret of the Wings
- Spike the Bee, a character in Disney's Donald Duck cartoons
- Spike, a character in the 1944 movie Million Dollar Kid
- Spike, a character in the 1996 American superhero movie Barb Wire
- Spike (Buffy the Vampire Slayer), a vampire in the TV series Buffy the Vampire Slayer and Angel
- Spike, Fonzie's cousin in Happy Days
- Spike, a character in the 28 Days Later (film series)
- Spike Fumo, the main character of Spike of Bensonhurst
- Christine "Spike" Nelson, a recurring character in the Degrassi franchise
- Spike Thomson, in Press Gang
- Spike Lester, on the soap opera Passions
- Spike (Marvel Comics), several Marvel Comics characters with the name
- Spike Freeman, another character in Marvel Comics' X-Statix/X-Force
- 'Spike' (a.k.a. 'Butch'), town bully in the Nancy strip and comix
- "Spike" Stoker, a supporting character from Jasper Fforde's Thursday Next books
- Joshua "Spike" Cohen, a Jew from Tom Robbins' novel Skinny Legs and All
- Cecil "Spike" Wilson, in the DC Comics comic book Sugar and Spike
- Spike Witwicky, a human from The Transformers cartoon
- Spike Lavery, on the soap opera All My Children
- Father Spike, a high-church parish priest who is mentioned in CS Lewis' book The Screwtape Letters
- Spike (Hollyoaks), in the UK soap opera
- Spike (Dragon Ball) or Akkuman, in the Dragon Ball manga series
- Michelangelo "Spike" Scarlatti, in the Canadian series Flashpoint
- Spike Spiegel, from the Japanese anime Cowboy Bebop
- Spike the cactus, a playable character in the mobile video games, Brawl Stars and Squad Busters

== See also ==
- Spyke, an X-Men: Evolution character
