= QN-202 =

Chinese-made portable fire-and-forget anti-tank missile

- Type: Anti-tank missile Surface-to-surface missile Surface-to-air missile
- Place of origin: China

Production history
- Designer: Wuhan Global Sensor Technology Co., Ltd
- Manufacturer: Wuhan Global Sensor Technology Co., Ltd

Specifications
- Maximum firing range: 2000 m
- Launch platform: Man-portable launcher

The QN-202 (Chinese: QN202人员携行式单兵飞弹系统) is a Chinese man-portable air-defense system (MANPADS) developed by Wuhan Global Sensor Technology Co., Ltd (Chinese: 武汉高德红外有限公司).

== History ==
The QN-202 was revealed in 2018.

Micro missiles, such as FN-M, QN-202, and JK-1, were revealed at roughly the same time, indicating they were likely part of a Chinese military program.

== Design ==
The QN-202 missile features a fire-and-forget engagement mode with infrared guidance seeker, allowing the user to seek cover immediately after launch. It has multiple launcher options. One is a muzzle-loading concealable, lightweight launcher with a pistol grip and a collapsible stock, It also comes with a backpack that could store 6 micro missiles. The second option is a shoulder-fired launcher with a more sophisicated fire control system. The missile can also be integrated with vehicles.

It has been compared to the Pike missile. The QN-202 is similar in size and weight but features fire-and-forget infrared tracking, instead of Pike's semi-active laser guidance.

== See also ==
- FN-M
