= XM1111 Mid-Range Munition =

MRM-CE
- Type: Dual use, B-LOS and LOS tank fired munition

Service history
- In service: Cancelled

Production history
- Manufacturer: Raytheon Missile Systems
- Unit cost: unknown

Specifications
- Mass: unknown
- Length: unknown
- Diameter: 120 mm (4.7 in)
- Wingspan: none
- Warhead: Shaped charge or kinetic energy penetrator
- Detonation mechanism: none
- Engine: none required
- Operational range: 12.1 km (7.5 mi)
- Flight altitude: N/A
- Maximum speed: approx. 900 m/s (3,000 ft/s) (at launch) 1,650 m/s (5,400 ft/s) (with full acceleration)
- Guidance system: Semi-active laser and uncooled imaging infrared (IIR) homing seeker
- Launch platform: M1 Abrams, Leopard 2

The XM1111 Mid-Range Munition (MRM) is a 120 mm precision guided munition developed for the Rheinmetall Rh-120 120mm gun (named the M256 in the US military) used by several Western tanks. It was also intended to fulfill a requirement for Future Combat Systems (canceled) for a long-range, beyond line of sight (BLOS) tank munition.

The U.S. Army awarded two contracts in a competition to validate the requirement, one for a kinetic energy penetrator round (MRM-KE) and one for a chemical energy high-explosive anti-tank (HEAT) warhead round (MRM-CE).

In December 2007, Raytheon's CE-based concept was awarded the system-design-and-development contract to develop the round. Valued at $232.3 million, the 63-month contract covered system design and development.

The Mid-Range Munition was cancelled in 2009 along with Future Combat Systems.

== MRM-KE ==
The Mid-Range Munition-Kinetic Energy (MRM-KE) was an implementation of the MRM under development by Alliant Techsystems, Lockheed Martin, BAE Systems, and HR Textron.

The missile–projectile was designed to be used as a high-velocity penetrator for line of sight and beyond line of sight shots. In line of sight, it would operate using laser guidance or a millimeter wave seeker. In BLOS, the shell would be fired in a ballistic arc, and would seek out its own target.

The missile used a kinetic energy penetrator to penetrate enemy armor. This effect was improved by a rocket motor that sped the munition up. It steered with impulse thrusters.

MRM-KE used technology developed as part of the X-Rod and XM1007 Tank Extended Range Munition (TERM) programs, both of which were cancelled.

=== Timeline ===
- April 2004: Successful test firing of the system.
- May 2006: Successful high Mach flight maneuver test at Yuma Proving Ground.
- July 2007: ATK Forms "Team MRM" to compete for the U.S. Army's XM1111 Mid-Range Munition Program.

== MRM-CE ==
The missile–projectile was to be a high-velocity multiple-mission projectile for line-of-sight and beyond-line-of-sight shots. In line of sight, it would operate using laser guidance or an uncooled imaging infrared seeker (IIR). In BLOS, the shell would be fired in a ballistic arc, and would glide to seek out its own targets. The BLOS mission could be autonomous or use FO directed target designation.

The MRM-CE uses a dual-mode MMW, imaging infrared (IIR) autonomous seeker or SAL is used to acquire and guide towards the target with high accuracy. The dual-mode seeker was developed and successfully demonstrated during a two-year, Army-managed science and technology program. MRM-CE refined seeker technology developed as part of the XM1007 Tank Extended Range Munition (TERM) program.

For a beyond-line-of-sight mission, the chemical energy warhead was a better solution; with proven lethality against the primary target of threat armor, and better effects against the secondary targets of buildings, fortifications, and light armor than a less versatile kinetic energy penetrator.

=== Specifications ===
- Warhead: Shaped charge HEAT.
- Guidance: Dual-mode MMW – imaging infrared homing or semi-active laser guidance.

=== Program status ===
- September 2006: A U.S. M1 Abrams tank fired an MRM-CE round which hit a moving T-72 tank at a range of 8.6 kilometres (5.3 mi).
- March 2007: Successful test firing using dual-mode seeker fusion.
- December 2007: Raytheon Wins Army XM-1111 Development Contract.

== See also ==
- List of gun-launched missiles
- M982 Excalibur, 155 mm extended range guided artillery shell
