= Spike (nickname) =

Spike is a nickname of the following people:

== Arts and entertainment ==
- Spike Eskin (born 1976), American radio personality
- Spike Feresten (born 1964), American television writer and talk show host
- Spike Jones (1911–1965), American musician and bandleader
- Spike Jonze (born 1969), American filmmaker and photographer
- Spike Lee (born 1957), American filmmaker
- Spike Milligan (1918–2002), Irish satirist, creator of The Goon Show
- Spike Robinson (1930–2001), jazz musician
- Spike Spencer (born 1968), American voice actor
- Spike Stent (born 1965), English record producer and mixing engineer
- Spike Trotman, American cartoonist and publisher
- Spike Wells (born 1946), English jazz drummer and priest

== Sports ==
- Spike Albrecht (born 1992), American college basketball player
- Spike Gehlhausen (born 1954), American race car driver
- Spike Jones (American football) (born 1947), American former National Football League punter
- Spike McRoy (born 1968), American golfer
- Spike Pola (1914–2012), Australian rules footballer
- Spike Carlyle (born 1993), American MMA fighter

== Military ==
- Cedric Howell (1896–1919), Australian First World War flying ace
- William H. P. Blandy (1890–1954), US Navy admiral
- William Eckert (1909–1971), US Air Force lieutenant general and fourth Commissioner of Major League Baseball
- William W. Momyer (1916–2012), US Air Force general and World War II flying ace

== Politics ==
- Spike Cohen (born 1982), American libertarian vice presidential candidate, political activist, entrepreneur, and podcaster

== Fictional characters ==
- Spike (Peanuts), Snoopy's brother in the Peanuts comic strip
- Spike the Bulldog (disambiguation)
- Spike the Dragon, a character from My Little Pony: Friendship is Magic
- Spike Spiegel, a character from Cowboy Bebop
- Spike Pratt, a character from Buffy the Vampire Slayer and Angel
- Spike, multiple characters from Marvel Comics
- Spike, a bulldog from Tom and Jerry
- Spike, a Koopa enemy and a workman from Mario
- Spike McNeil, a character from You, Me and the Apocalypse
- Spike, a Stegosaurus from Land Before Time
