= The Spike (novel) =

Book by Arnaud de Borchgrave

- First edition (US)
- Author: Arnaud de Borchgrave, Robert Moss
- Language: English
- Publication date: 1980

The Spike is a 1980 spy thriller novel by Arnaud de Borchgrave and Robert Moss (New York: Crown Publishers, 1980). Drawing on de Borchgrave's experience as a jet-setting Newsweek journalist and conservative Washington insider, it tells the story of a radical '60s journalist, Bob Hockney, who stumbles upon a Soviet plot for global supremacy by 1985. When he tries to expose the web of blackmail, sex and espionage, he's hamstrung by his editors' liberal media bias.

In the news world, to "spike" a story means to cancel its publication. De Borchgrave and Moss envision a scenario in which the KGB exploits the attitudes of the unsuspecting Western media, which was allegedly more interested in unmasking CIA agents than stopping the Soviets, threatening to thwart Hockney's big scoop.

The best-selling book was marketed not only as a spy thriller but an exposé of real-life Washington. Time called the book a roman à clef for its fictionalized versions of real people and organizations, including Zbigniew Brzezinski and the radical left-wing magazine Ramparts.

In a 1980 interview with The New York Times, de Borchgrave mentions that he came up with the idea for a novel after he and his wife had to hide in the English countryside, after anonymous threats were made in response to a Newsweek article he wrote that named some of the terrorists behind the 1972 Munich massacre.

The authors' 1983 follow-up, Monimbo, envisioned Miami race rioters as the pawns of Nicaraguan and Cuban communists.
