= SPIKES =

Protocol used in clinical medicine to break bad news to patients and families

The SPIKES protocol is a method used in clinical medicine to break bad news to patients and families. As receiving emotionally distressing information can cause distress and anxiety, clinicians need to deliver the news carefully. Using the SPIKES method is an acronym for introducing and communicating information to patients and their families, can aid in the presentation of the material. The SPIKES method is helpful in providing an organized manner of communication during situations that are typically complex and difficult to communicate.

This method has received praises and criticism, while majorly influencing clinician-patient communication. According to research related to the SPIKES method, important factors to consider when using this protocol involve empathy, acknowledgement, culture, and validation of feelings, providing information about intervention and treatment, and ensuring that the patient clearly understands the news being delivered.

The protocol was first published in 2000 by Baile et al, in the context of oncology.

== Steps ==
The name SPIKES is an acronym, where the letters stand for:

- S: setting, i.e. setting up the consultation appropriately:

→ The patient should only be provided with the bad news when they are in a private setting that contains little to no distractions to ensure the message is being properly received. Examples of inappropriate settings are: via phone call or in an open area such as a hallway. Furthermore, the clinician should remember to be facing the patient and the family throughout the process and establish therapeutic alliance or connection through the use of eye contact and physical touch, i.e. holding a hand or touching an arm.

- P: perception, i.e. assessing the patient's perception of the situation:

→ The clinician should initiate the process by asking the patient what they believe is going on. This can allow the clinician to find out to what extent the patient knows about the situation, and also engages the patient, acquiring their attention. It allows for them to realize that their thoughts matter and forms a starting point for how to proceed. Most importantly, the response of the patient can lead to any misconceptions to be corrected by the clinician immediately.

- I: invitation, i.e. prompting the patient to invite the clinician to deliver the news:

→ Phrases such as "Shall I share the results of the scan with you now?" or "Is this a good time to share with you what I believe is going on?" allow for the patient to decide if they are ready to proceed and also allow for open discussion to follow. Phrasing is important because the fundamental purpose of this step is for the clinician to request permission to share unpleasant news with the patient. The way this is worded must show respect for the patient's feelings and inquire about their readiness to receive news.

- K: knowledge, i.e. providing the knowledge to the patient:

→ The clinician should speak slowly, maintain eye contact, and use terms both parties can understand. The clinician should then explain what the bad news means for the patient while avoiding adding extra details initially as this is the place to be clear and concise about what is happening.

- E: empathy, i.e. empathizing with the impact of the news on the patient:

→ Understanding the thoughts and feelings in the minds of the patient and their family can be difficult. It is often best for the clinician to remain silent instead of speaking out as everyone is processing emotions. When the clinician feels it is appropriate to speak, they should speak with empathy and acknowledge that the patient is feeling something. Tears or silence should never be discouraged, this may be a processing strategy that is necessary to fully acknowledge the situation. Support should be provided.

- S: strategy, i.e. devising a strategy for what to do next:

→ The clinician then summarizes all thoughts and helps the patient decide where to go from here. Options to discuss may be treatment, setting another meeting, discussing hospice care, etc. Each situation is unique and it is best to do what is in the best interest of the patient's wants and needs.

== Influence and Criticism of the SPIKES method ==
The SPIKES protocol has had an influence on medical communication training. Since its introduction, it has become one of the most widely taught methods for delivering difficult news in clinical practices. Multiple studies have found that physicians across multiple countries recognize the SPIKES protocol as a helpful structural guide for organizing emotionally complex and even difficult conversations. Researchers found that physicians and clinicians located in Oman were familiar with the steps of the SPIKES method and viewed the protocol as a valuable tool for improving confidence and professionalism when communicating difficult or distressing news. Similarly, international uses are found in research from Nigeria, where many clinicians reported using the SPIKES protocol either formally or informally as a tool for structuring these difficult conversations.

Researchers however, have observed that patient needs are often more nuanced than what the six-step SPIKES protocol can fully cover. Researchers showed that patients differ widely in their preferences regarding information depth, pacing, emotional support, and involvement in the decision making process. These variations revealed that following the SPIKES protocol in a very rigid manner may overlook individual patient preferences. In response, newer tools such as the MABBAN scale, specifically measure which elements of the SPIKES model that patients tend to value the most. Their findings suggested that while many of the SPIKES components align with patient expectations, not all patients prioritize the same aspects.

Scholars have also criticized SPIKES for focusing too heavily on physicians behavior without fully addressing the interactive, relational, and evolving aspects of breaking bad news. They argue that the emotional and cognitive needs of patients are not static and therefore require a more dynamic, and patient centered approach than the SPIKES protocol had originally proposed. Their revised SPw-ICE-S model emphasizes additional elements, like ongoing emotional attunement, checking patient understanding and comprehension throughout the conversation, and supporting the patient. These are areas that the SPIKES method covers very minimally. This critique points to the broader concern, which is that SPIKES may be too rigid for real world clinical implications, which tend to require circling back, adjusting communication strategies, and responding flexibly to the patient's cues.

Another recurring criticism among studies involves the gap between knowledge of the protocol and consistent, high quality execution. Multiple studies found that although many clinicians understood the steps of the SPIKES protocol, actual execution during clinical practices varied considerably, often due to external factors like time constraints, emotional discomfort, or limited communication training. These critics argue that without continuous practice, constructive feedback, and support through the medical institution, the SPIKES protocol risks becoming a checklist rather than a meaningful tool for empathetic patient care.

== Alternative Methods ==
Another approach to delivering bad news is the ABCDE mnemonic, which shares many similarities with the SPIKES protocol but differs in structure and emphasis. While SPIKES focuses on steps such as setting, perception, invitation, knowledge, and empathy, the ABCDE method organizes communication around advance preparation, building a therapeutic environment, communicating well, dealing with patient reactions, and evaluating the situation afterward. Both methods aim to help clinicians communicate difficult information with honesty, empathy, and clarity, while also supporting the patient emotionally, however the ABCDE approach has been described as practical and flexible for everyday clinical settings.

== Benefits for Patients and Clinicians ==
Preparation is important because studies show that health care professionals find breaking bad news very distressing, isolating, and emotionally demanding, especially when they feel connected to a patient. During this research, it showed that many health professionals experience discomfort, relational distress, fear of saying the wrong thing, feelings of detachment, guilt, self-blame, or a sense of failure, and tension in a work culture that expects toughness and provides little time to process emotions and get support. Often, this stress carries over into home life and affects well-being, and can not only affect the way they interact with future clients but also the way they cope with their own private emotions outside the workplace .

As healthcare has shifted towards a more patient autonomy, the challenges faced by clinicians when delivering bad news have received increasing attention. Healthcare systems should be providing clinicians with time to process after the delivery of bad news, encourage open discussion and vulnerability about the subject, create safe spaces and team support, as well as promoting reflective practice and proper training. These measures help reduce burnout among healthcare professionals and maintain the quality of patient care.

Communication while delivering bad news can affect a patient's treatment decisions. One study showed that patients' experiences during bad news delivery directly influenced whether they continued treatment with the same doctor, switched doctors, or if they stopped treatment entirely. 49% of patients in the study stayed with the same doctor, 45.5% changed doctors, and 5.5% stopped treatment. Patients were more likely to stop care or leave treatment if the doctor had poor behavior during disclosure, limited time, lack of emotional support, use of medical jargon, downplaying diagnosis, or lack of empathy. However, patients were more likely to continue treatment with their doctor when the clinician was perceived as honest, showed empathy, gave plenty of time, encouraged questions, and supported understanding. The biggest issue that they found in communication when delivering bad news was time pressure. 42% of patients in the study felt that the doctor did not spend enough time with them after delivering the news, and this strongly correlated with whether or not they stayed in treatment with that doctor. This shows just how important proper bad news delivery is because it not only can affect the person's well-being if delivered in an insensitive way, but it can also determine whether or not they seek treatment or continue with the same doctor.
