= NAVAIR Spike =

Spike
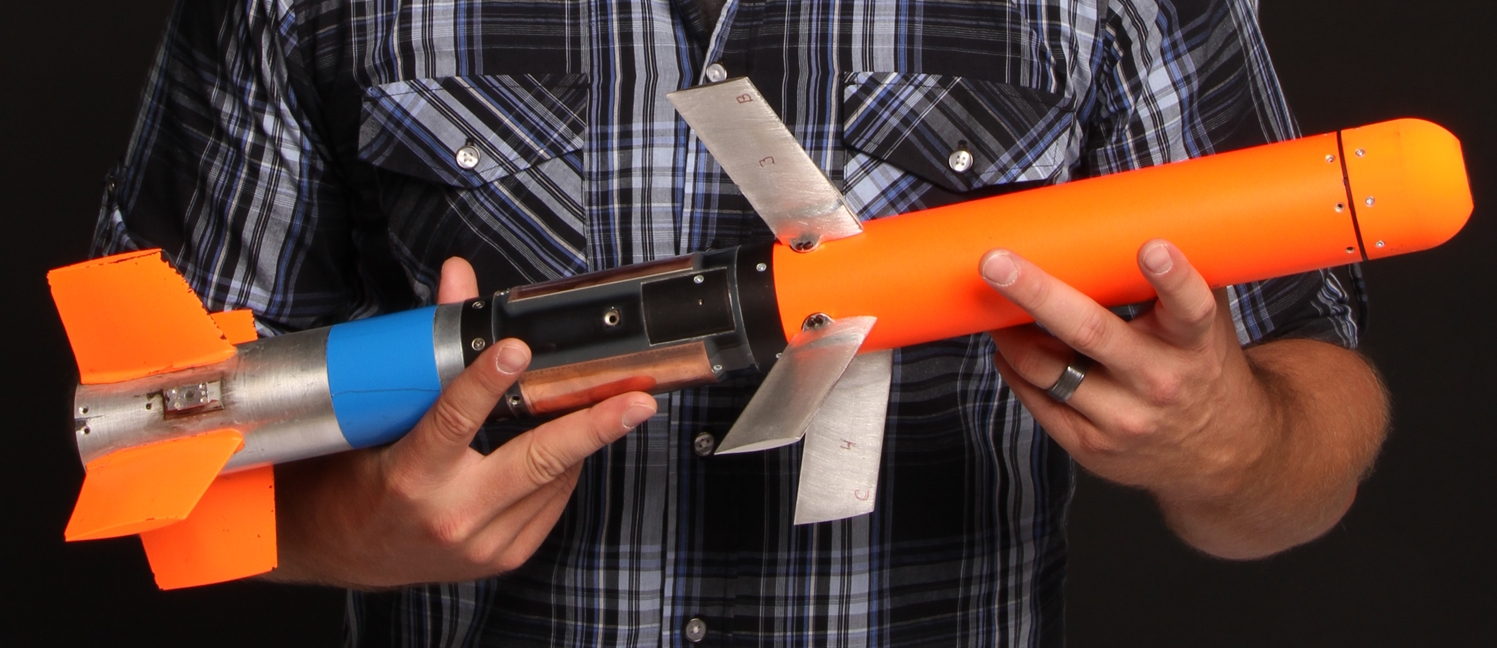
- Type: Miniature missile
- Place of origin: United States

Production history
- Designer: NAVAIR
- Unit cost: $50,000

Specifications
- Mass: 5.4 lb (2.4 kg)
- Length: 25 in (640 mm)
- Diameter: 2.25 in (57 mm)
- Crew: One
- Maximum firing range: 2 mi (3.2 km)+
- Warhead weight: 1 lb (450 g) EFP
- Maximum speed: 600 mph (970 km/h; 270 m/s)
- Guidance system: EO, SAL, Inertial

The Spike, also called the Forward Firing Miniature Munition (F2M2), is a small missile developed by the USA Naval Air Warfare Center Weapons Division (NAWCWD), NAVAIR's Weapons Division, currently being produced by Small Missile Company (SMC) in California.

== Background ==
The Spike was developed in response to operational needs encountered during operations against asymmetric warfare opponents.

Guided missiles like the AGM-114 Hellfire fired from aircraft and FGM-148 Javelin used by infantry have disadvantages when used against insurgents in urban areas. They are both cost-prohibitive, at around $100,000 per missile, and are designed to be used against slow-moving, heavily armored vehicles, such as tanks.

However, during the Iraq War, they were employed against personnel and fast-moving, unarmored vehicles. Also, because they are made to destroy heavy vehicles, they use large warheads that could inflict unnecessary collateral damage.

The Spike was made to provide infantry with a shoulder-fired guided fire-and-forget missile system lighter and cheaper than the Javelin and produce light and more numerous weapons for unmanned aerial vehicles (UAVs) to carry.

== History ==
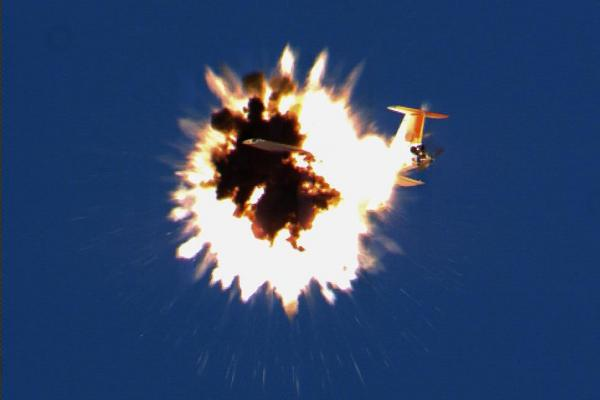
NAVAIR Spike hits MQM-170C Outlaw target drone

On 26 May 2004, the Spike accomplished its first three controlled test flights. The reduced-smoke motor propelled the missile from the launcher with a barely visible smoke trail, accelerating the missile to 600 mph (970 km/h; 270 m/s) in under 1.5 seconds.

On 12 April 2006, the Spike was launched at a 2-meter diameter target from 1,000 meters, impacting 8 in (200 mm) from the center.

In May 2007, the Spike was fired at a moving vehicle target traveling 30 mph (48 km/h) from 750 meters away, successfully tracking and hitting it.

On 12 February 2008, the missile went through a test firing from a mountaintop, simulating a UAV launch, and hit a vehicle target moving 20 mph (32 km/h) from 1.5 mi (2.4 km) away.

In 2012, ARDEC and NAWCWD engineers discussed combining the Palletized Protection System (PPS), which uses radar to detect airborne and ground-based targets and cues a mounted camera toward them, with the Spike to quickly engage targets detected.

The Spike conducted an interception of an airborne target in June 2013 using this method, demonstrating its potential as a kill mechanism to accomplish the counter-UAV mission.

In December 2016, two Spikes integrated with proximity fuses demonstrated the capability of the missile to shoot down UAVs.

== Design ==
Spike was designed by the U.S. Navy, with assistance from DRS Technologies, and is proclaimed to be "the world's smallest guided missile."

Initially made to be carried by U.S. Marines, with three Spike missiles and the launcher able to fit in a standard backpack, it weighs 5.4 lb (2.4 kg), is 25 in (640 mm) long, and 2.25 in (57 mm) in diameter. The warhead weighs about 1 lb (450 g) and employs the Explosively Formed Projectile (EFP) effect, made to penetrate before detonating.

The Spike is powered by a small rocket motor that gives it a range exceeding 2 mi (3.2 km). The missile is directed to its target by either an electro-optical (EO) or semi-active laser (SAL) seeker; the EO camera is similar to a basic cellphone camera, containing a 1-megapixel video camera that allows the shooter to select the area to engage in a fire-and-forget mode. The EO seeker cannot operate at night, so the SAL would have to be used. A third targeting mode is inertial, meaning the user can "snap and shoot" at a target without needing to lock on out to 200 meters.

Both the Spike missile and reusable launcher each cost $50,000 and weigh 10 lb (4.5 kg) loaded, compared to 49 lb (22 kg) for a Javelin missile and fire control unit.

== Usage ==
In addition to giving ground troops a lightweight missile, the Spike could easily be adapted to fit onto vehicles, aircraft, and small boats. Medium UAVs have difficulty carrying missiles such as the 100 lb (45 kg) Hellfire due to weight and thrust issues, so that the Spike could be bolted on with less effect.

Smaller size and less weight allow more Spike missiles to be carried, and the smaller warhead provides lethality against soft targets with less chance of collateral damage. It can also be used by watercraft to defend against fast attack craft (FAC) and fast inshore attack craft (FIAC), where Spike's low cost enables more missiles to be available against large numbers of swarming targets.

Although its warhead might not be able to destroy the boats, its superior accuracy would let it hit critical areas to knock them out of commission.

== See also ==
- AGM-176 Griffin
- Pyros (bomb)
- Advanced Precision Kill Weapon System
- Martlet (missile)
- Roketsan Cirit
