= Osa (handgun) =

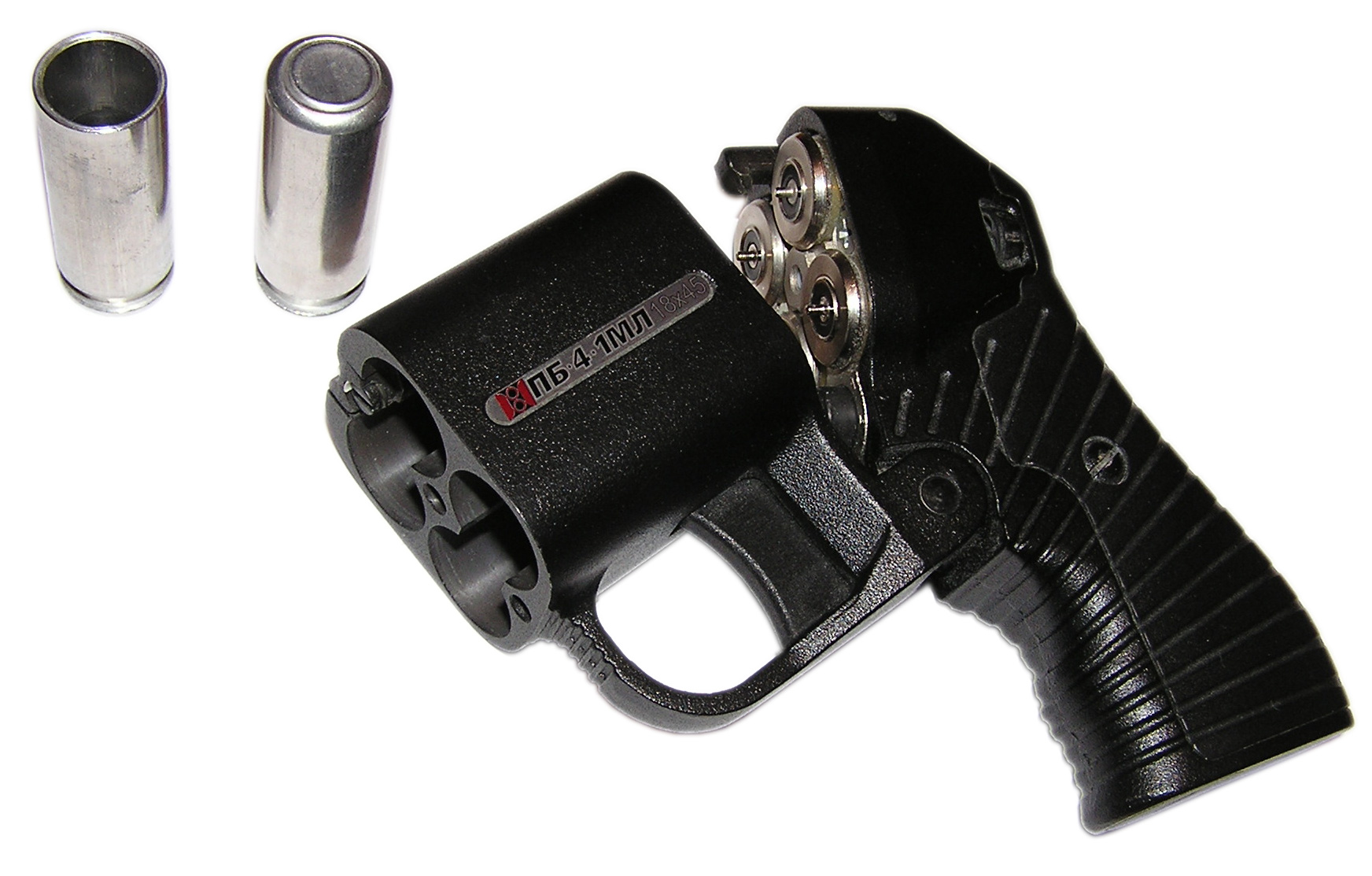
- PB-4M
- Type: Non-lethal pistol
- Place of origin: Russia

Service history
- In service: Current
- Used by: Russia

Production history
- Designed: 1997–1999
- Produced: 1999–present

Specifications
- Mass: 0.4 kg (0.88 lb)
- Length: 45 mm (1.8 in)
- Cartridge: 18×45 mm T
- Caliber: 18 mm (0.71 in)
- Barrels: 4
- Action: Double action, break action
- Feed system: 4-round chamber

The PB-4 Osa (Russian: ПБ-4 «ОСА», "wasp"), is a family of Russian non-lethal pistols that can be also used as a flare gun, a flashbang gun, or a starting pistol. The system consists of the pistol (2-4 cartridges, laser target pointer, electronic ignition capsule), and various ammunition types.

The Osa was developed in the 1990s by G.A. Bideev. It was designed and is manufactured by the state-owned Federal Center for Research and Manufacturing and the Institute for Science and Research in Applied Chemistry. The pistol is available in the civilian market.

== Design details ==
The PB-4 is a four-barreled break-action gun. It has two horizontal "8"-shaped chambers in its aluminum chamber block, each housing two rounds. There is no need for a separate chamber for each round, because the gas pressure is contained by the cartridges' thick cylindrical case (the external case diameter is 18mm, while the bullet caliber is 15.3mm). This design aims to prevent the gun from operating properly if the round is unlawfully modified to increase its power. The cartridge case also performs the function of the barrel, with the bullet positioned deep inside and accelerating within the case. The front end of the case is level with the front end of the chamber block when in firing position. There is a four-fingered extractor in the central channel of the chamber block; the cartridge cases are rimless and have an extractor groove. The extractor keeps cases from falling forward outside of the chamber block. When the action is opened, cases are extracted backwards for manual reloading. The trigger and trigger guard are fixed to lower side of the chamber block.

The chamber block is locked to the handle block, which contains the locking surface, firing button (pushed by the trigger when the chamber block is locked), pistol grip, battery and electronics. The cartridge primers are ignited electrically, so there are four circular contact plates on the locking surface (contacting the case bottom) and four contact pins in the center of each plate (contacting the primer). On the trigger pull an impulse is generated. The electronic firing mechanism is able to send firing impulses in sequence to the chambers from 1 to 4 and to skip chambers with malfunctioning rounds to avoid misfires. The weapon is only capable of firing one round at a time. There are different models of PB-4; in some, the firing mechanism is fed by a battery, on others by a piezoelectric igniter similar to those used by kitchen gas lighters.

There is a simple sight assembly atop the chamber block – a semi-cylindrical groove along it, and a white forward post at the front of the groove. Some variants of PB-4 have a built-in laser sight with a laser window in the center of the "locking surface", and the beam following the central extractor channel of the chamber block. The laser switch on the left side of the handle block is operated by the thumb, and the laser is fed by a battery inside the pistol grip. There are no safety switches – the locked and loaded weapon is always ready to fire (provided the battery is not discharged, for the models which use a battery).

The Osa Handgun M09 has been marketed in The Americas via Defenzia, LLC in the United States and Defenzia, LTDA in Brazil. Defenzia plans on assembling and manufacturing the pistols in Brazil and subsequently in the United States beginning in 2016 under the Brand Defenzia.

Osa and Defenzia have entered into this joint agreement in 2014. In 2016 both companies plan on launching the civilian "M11" version of the weapon in the USA. This new less-lethal weapon for the civilian market will come in 50 Caliber and have the same capabilities as the law-enforcement weapon, and awaits BATF approval.

== Non-lethality ==
The pistol comes with five different types of shells

- Pepper Gel [Note: For use in self-defence against animals only]
- Rubber Bullet
- FlashBang [5,000,000 candelas & 145 dB within 1 to 3 meter area of effect]
- Signal Flare (Red, Yellow or Green) [120-140 meters altitude, visibility: 2 kilometers (Daylight) or 5 kilometers (Nighttime); 4-6 second duration] The crimp disc is the same color as the flare.
- Light [70-80 meters altitude, 100,000 candelas; 4 second duration]

A person shot from about 1 meter with an 18x45T Osa pistol to the temporal region of the head suffered a penetrative injury, with the bullet traversing most of the brain, reducing the victim to a vegetative state.

== Variants ==
=== Russian ===
- PB-2 "Egida" (Aegis), ПБ-2 ОСА-"ЭГИДА" Twin barreled version first marketed in 2006
- PB-4 "Osa" (ПБ-4 "ОСА") – first model, 18×45 mm cartridge, piezo priming, mechanical barrel selector, production started in 1999
- PB-4M (ПБ-4М) – second model, 18×45 mm cartridge, piezo priming, electronic barrel selector, production started in 2002
- PB-4-1 (ПБ-4-1) – model with built-in laser sight, 18×45 mm cartridge, battery priming, user-controlled electronic barrel selector, production started in 2003
- PB-4-1ML (ПБ-4-1МЛ) – new model with built-in laser sight, 18×45 mm cartridge, piezo priming, electronic barrel selector, production started in 2005
- PB-4-2 (ПБ-4-2) – model, 18.5×55 mm cartridge
- PB-4-3 Compact (ПБ-4-3 «Компакт») - lighter and smaller four-shot model chambered for 15x40 mm.
- Osa M 09(ОСА М 09) – new model, 18.5×55 mm cartridge
- PB-4SP (ПБ-4СП) – "service model", 18.5×60 mm cartridge, in 2005 adopted by Ministry of the Interior of the Russian Federation as service weapon for several categories of Russian law enforcement (Moscow Metro post and patrol Militia unit, etc.), later adopted as service weapon for military police units

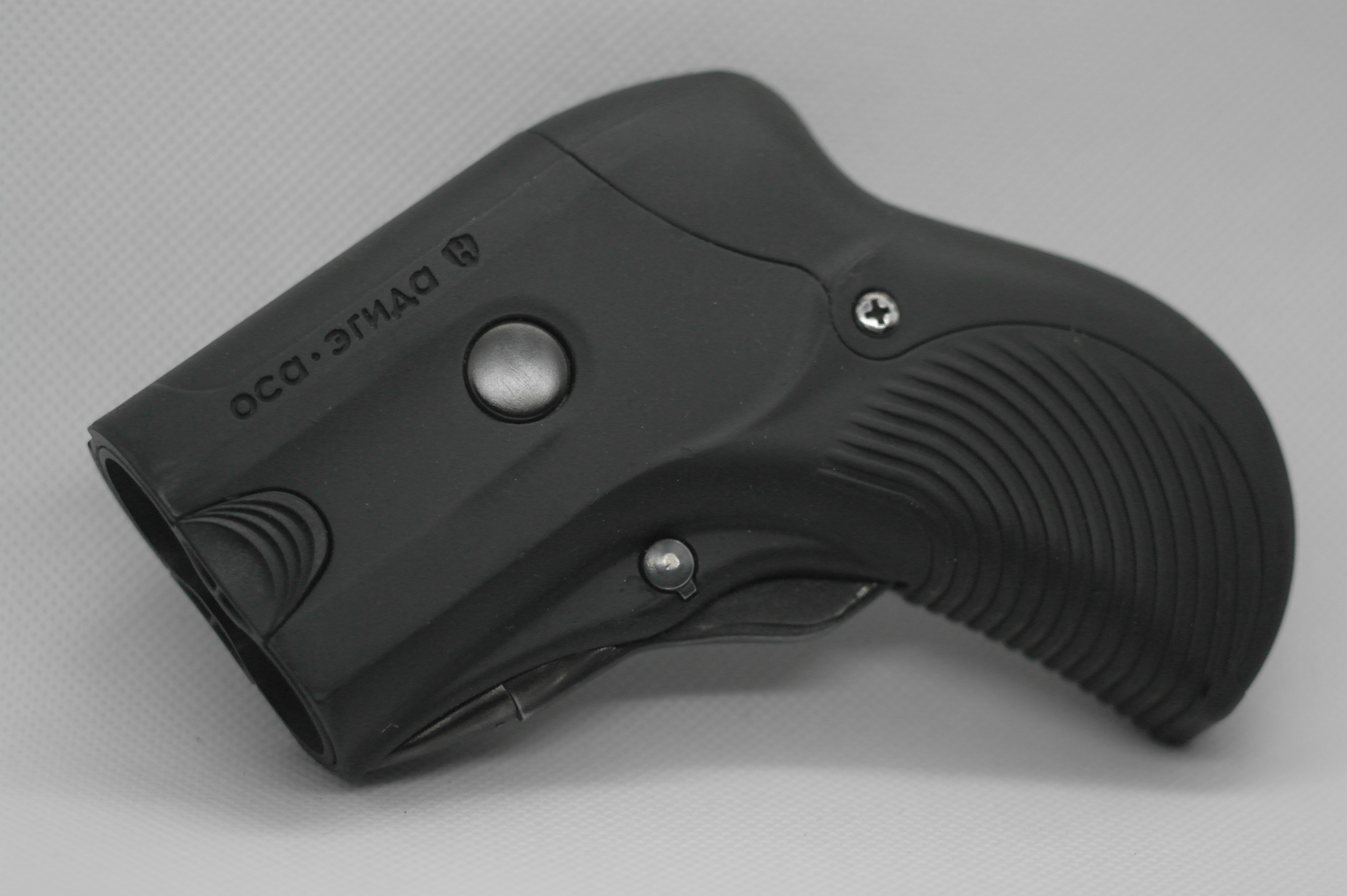
PB2 - Twin barreled variant

=== Brazilian ===
Defenzia of Brazil manufactures the following two variants:

- Defenzia D-09 - 12 gauge, traditional shotgun shells cannot be loaded into the pistol, fires the following:
  - .55 Caliber Rubber Bullets,
  - OC/ Pepper-Gel,
  - Flashbang (145 dB/ 5,000,000 Candles),
  - (SOS) Flares, and
  - High-intensity flares called Sky Candles (250 ft altitude, 300 foot dome of light)
- Defenzia D11 - .50 caliber with rifled barrels

== Legal status and operators ==
- Armenia – law enforcement units
- Czech Republic – law enforcement units
- Germany – after exposition "Enforce Tac-2013" (Nuremberg, 7–8 March 2013) several Osa handguns were ordered for German police
- Israel – law enforcement units
- Kazakhstan – The use of non-lethal weapons in Kazakhstan is permitted to civil population, and it is also used by private security guards
- Russia – The use of non-lethal weapons in Russia is permitted to civil population, and it is also used by private security and law enforcement units.
- Saudi Arabia – law enforcement units
- United Arab Emirates – law enforcement units
- USA – Arizona police, Pinal County Sheriff's Office - uses Defenzia variant

== Cartridges ==
A set of "Osa" consists of several types of cartridges, intended for self-defense (and traumatic light-and-sound) and illumination.

- 18×45T (18×45T) – traumatic cartridge equipped 15.3 mm rubber bullet in aluminum case. The traumatic cartridge contains an 11.6 g bullet, made of rubber and having a metal reinforcing core. This bullet has an initial speed of about 120 m / s and a muzzle energy of about 85 J. The bullet causes a shock when it hits the target.
- 18×45 O (18×45 O) – white flash (105 candela)
- 18×45 S (18×45 С) – a signal cartridge in aluminum case with coloured (yellow, red or green) flare
- 18×45 SZ (18×45 СЗ) – light-and-sound (flash-bang) cartridge in aluminum case contains a special charge, providing an extremely loud and bright shot, produced since 2004
- 18×45 I (18×45 И) – tear gas cartridge (capsaicin + CN), produced since 2005
- 18×45 Pr. (18×45 Пр.) – inert version of cartridge in aluminum case used for education and practice during training
- 18×45 SM (18×45 СМ, "патрон фейерверочный") – aerial firework cartridge in aluminum case
- 18×45 RSh (18×45 РШ) – traumatic cartridge equipped 12 g rubber bullet, produced since 2010. The traumatic cartridge contains a 22 mm bullet, made of rubber without a metal reinforcing core in aluminum case and has a muzzle energy of about 100 J
- 18×45 «A+A» – traumatic cartridge equipped 15.3 mm rubber bullet in plastic case. The traumatic cartridge contains a bullet, made of rubber and having a metal reinforcing core. This bullet has a muzzle energy of about 91 J.
- 18×45 RG (18×45 РГ) – traumatic cartridge equipped rubber bullet in composite case. The traumatic cartridge contains an 11.6 g bullet, made of rubber and having a metal reinforcing core
- 18.5×55T (18.5×55T) – traumatic cartridge equipped 15.7 mm rubber bullet in aluminum case. The traumatic cartridge contains a 13.2 g bullet

The pistol launcher itself generates an electric pulse to ignite the gunpowder charge.

== See also ==
- Makarych
- Pistol HORHE
