= Traumatic pistol =

Non-lethal firearm

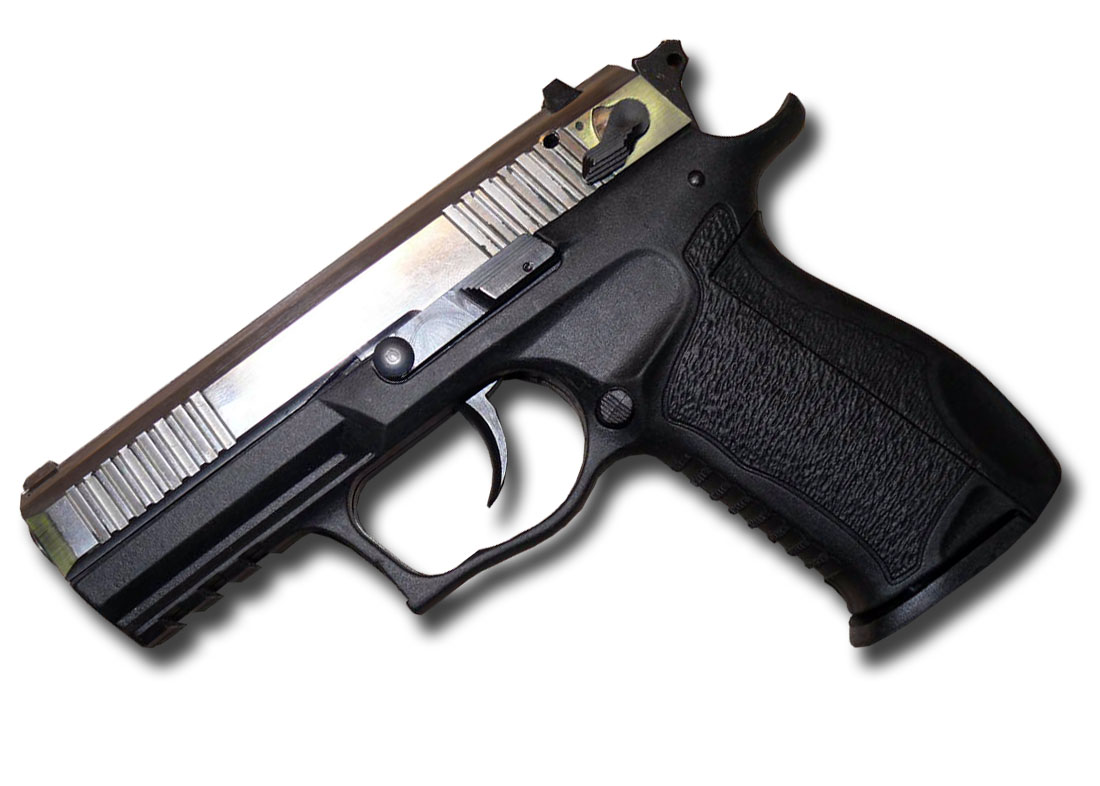
Russian pistol Horhe that can be loaded with either rubber bullets or gas cartridges

A traumatic pistol or traumatic handgun is a non-lethal weapon in the form of a pistol that fires non-lethal projectiles, typically rubber bullets.

Some gas pistols have an option of loading rubber bullets.

== Legality ==
- Kazakhstan: in 2008 traumatic pistols were allowed for sale for general population, however the permission was retracted in 2014. That year it was estimated 17,800 citizens owned traumatic pistols. By the law these pistols are allowed for law enforcement agencies and private security guards.
- Romania: By a 2004 law, nonlethal weapons are permitted for population provided they are registered.
- Russia: Russian law does not use the term "traumatic pistol" and since 2011 the Russian Federal Law on Weapons classified them as "огнестрельное оружие ограниченного поражения" (ОООП), "firearms of limited lethality". For civil models there are limitations on muzzle energy, number of cartridges in the magazine (drum), etc.

Informal terms резинострел, rezinostrel, ("rubbershoot") and травмат, travmat are also used in Russia.

- Ukraine: A permit must be obtained from the Civil Security Department of the Ministry of Internal Affairs of Ukraine. The civilian models are subject to strict power restrictions.

== See also ==
- Category: Traumatic pistols in Russian Wikipedia
- Riot gun
