= Sponge grenade =

Less-lethal projectile

A sponge grenade is a riot control weapon, intended to be non-lethal, which is fired from a 40 mm grenade launcher to cause confusion, or otherwise temporarily disable its target. As a single blunt force object, it is best used when aimed at a particular individual.

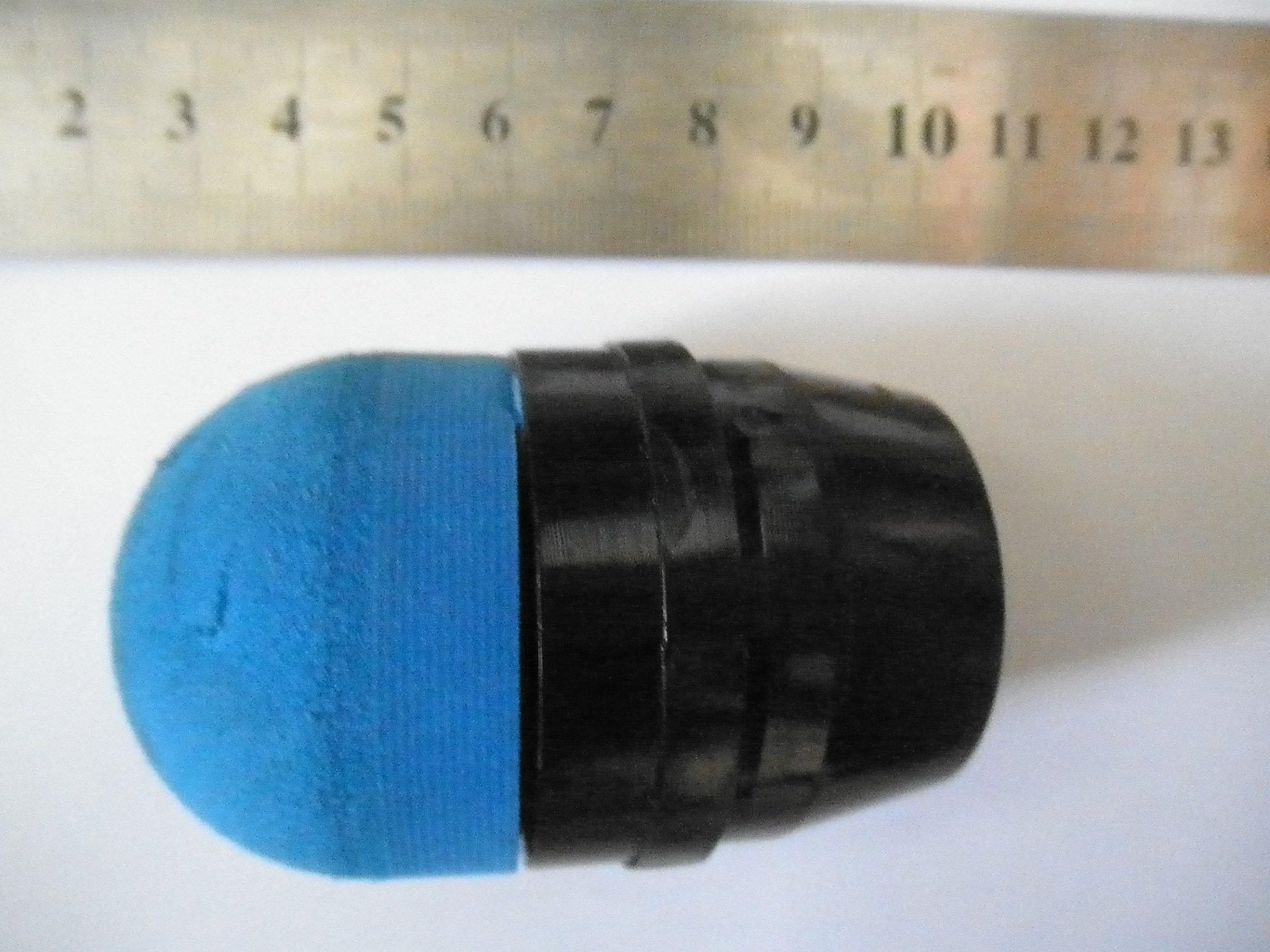
Sponge grenade projectile

The projectile weighs about 28 grams (0.99 ounces). It is bullet-shaped, with a foam rubber nose and a high-density, plastic projectile body.

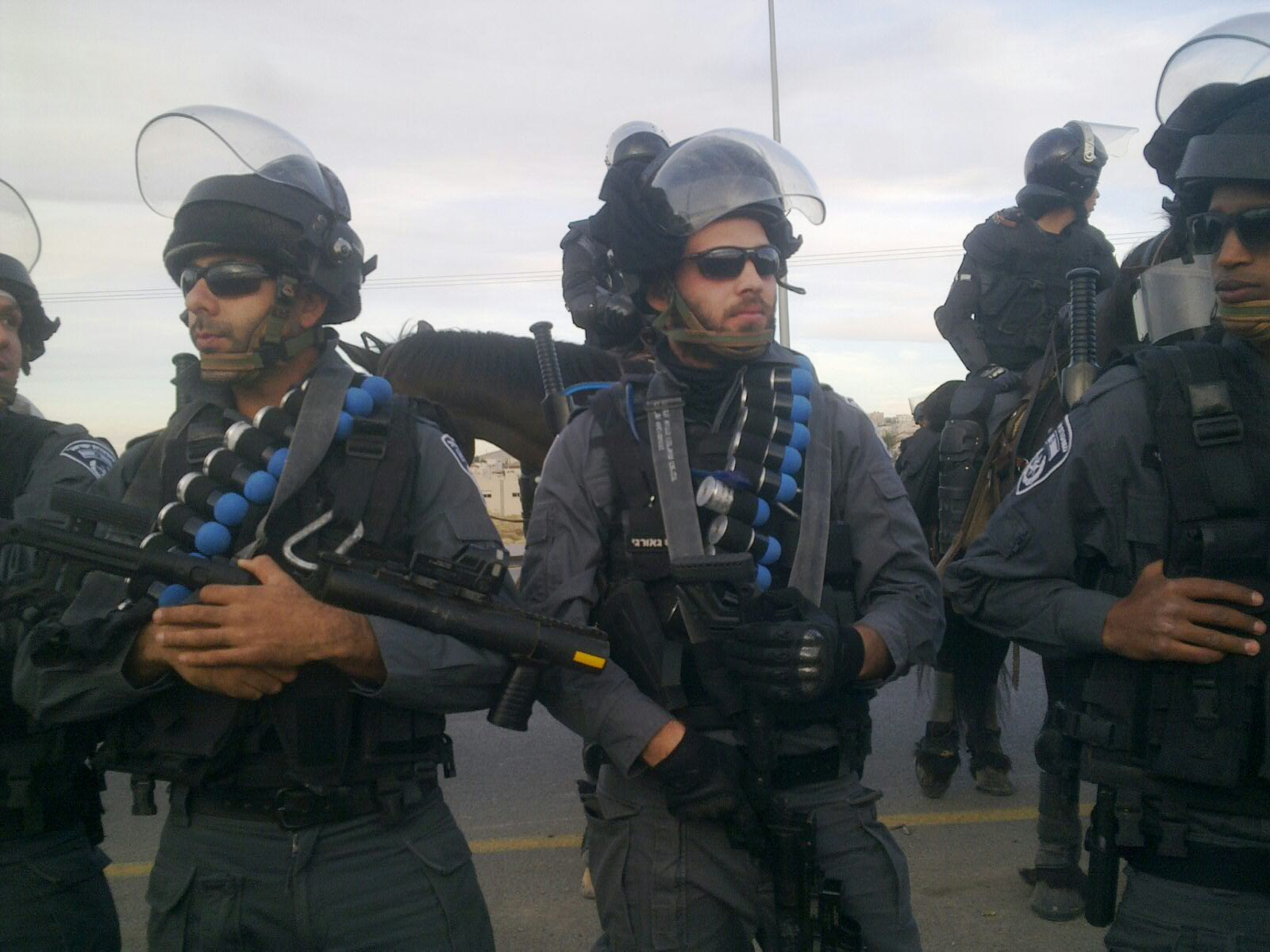
Israeli Policemen carrying Sponge grenades against Bedouin demonstrators in Hura, November 2013

== Potential for injury or death ==
Proper use of the weapons involves firing it from a medium distance, and aiming for the legs or lower torso. Firing it too close, or firing it too far away which decreases the ability to accurately aim for the legs or lower torso, can cause serious injury.

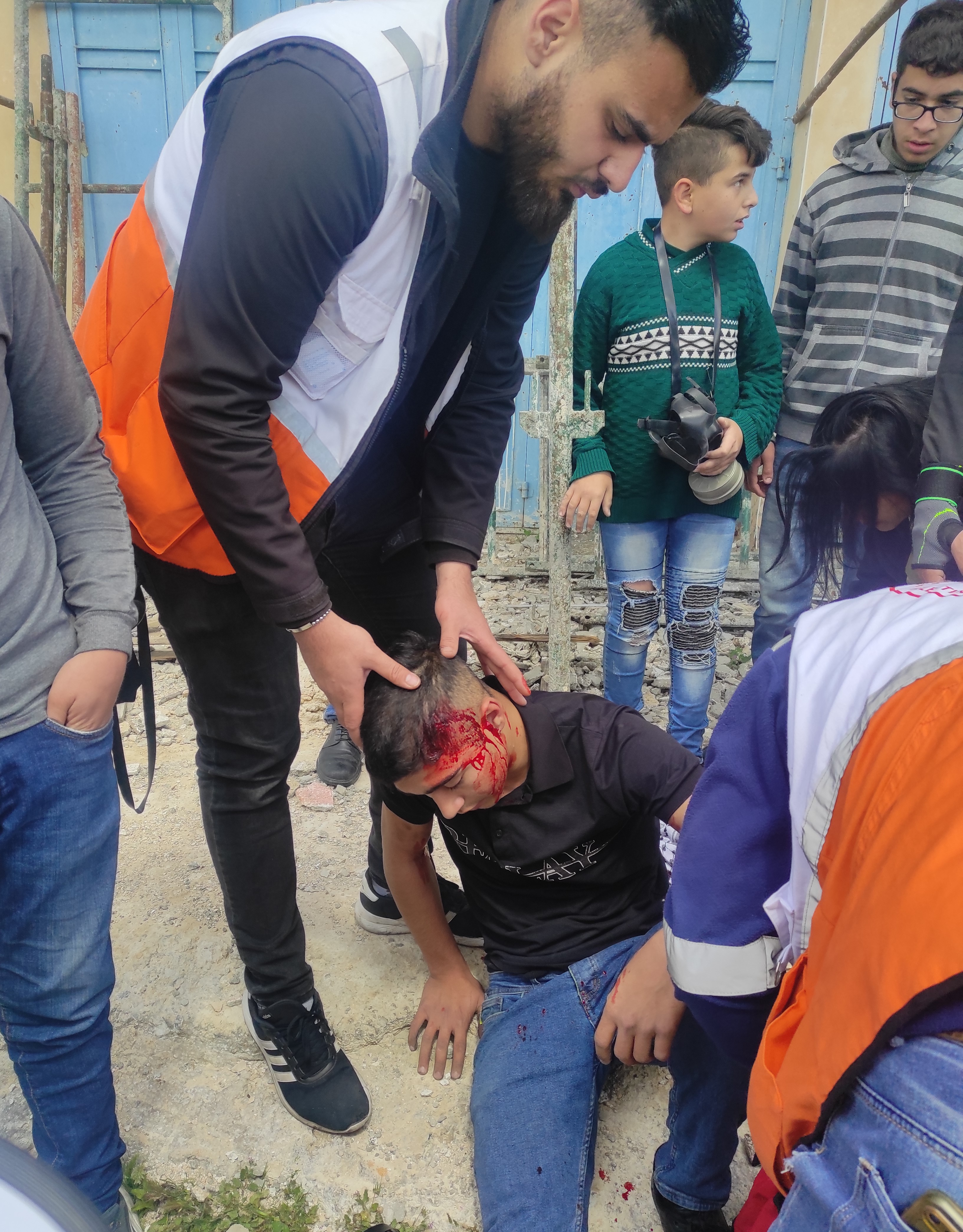
Head injury from sponge grenade, Kafr Qaddum

Improper use of sponge grenades can cause broken bones, head wounds, or permanent damage to eyes. Sponge grenades impacting the upper body or head can kill.

Demonstrator hit by sponge grenade in Ni'lin, November 2015

== Use around the world ==
=== Israel ===
Israel has deployed sponge grenades against Palestinian protesters on several occasions, and has also used the grenades against Israeli demonstrators during 2015 protests against police brutality.

=== Hong Kong ===
The Hong Kong Police Force has deployed sponge grenades as a riot control tool on several occasions in July 2019 during the anti-extradition protests.

=== New Zealand ===
During the fourth week of the 2022 Wellington protests against COVID-19 pandemic safety measures, the New Zealand Police deployed sponge grenades as one of the many tools used in their effort to clear the parliamentary grounds of rioters.

=== United States ===
Sponge grenades were used by some police departments during the George Floyd protests in the summer of 2020 and were cited as being one of the most common types of less-lethal rounds employed. In some cases, protesters were hit in the head or face with the rounds, causing serious injury. Police shot journalist Linda Tirado in the face with a sponge grenade, permanently blinding her in one eye; she entered hospice care four years later due to the traumatic brain injury.

== See also ==
- Non-lethal weapon
- Baton round
- Rubber bullet
- Plastic bullet
- Bean bag round
- Wooden bullet
