= KSPZ Jäger =

KSPZ Horhe Jäger
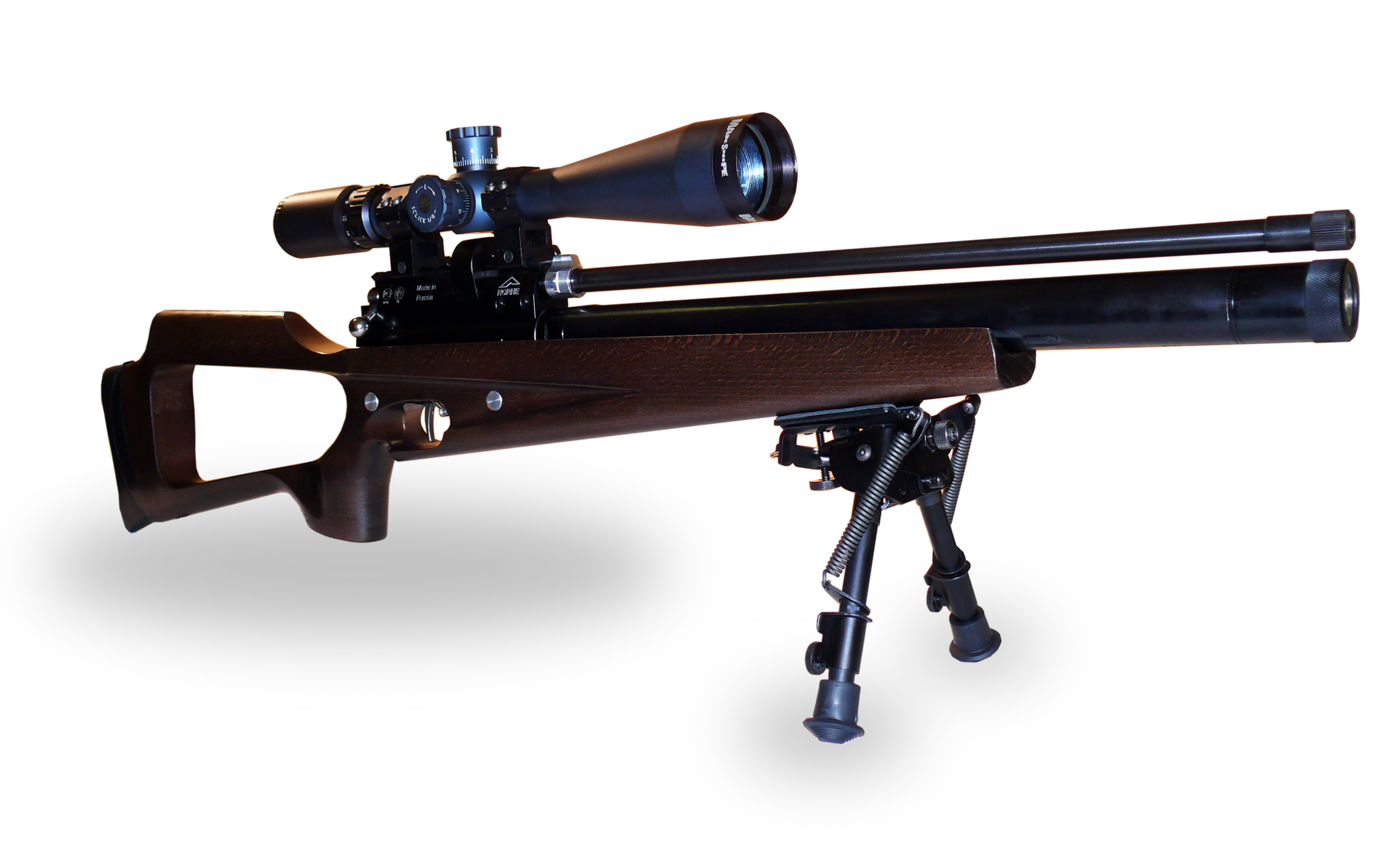
- KSPZ Horhe Jäger
- Type: Pre-Charged Pneumatic air gun
- Place of origin: Russia

Service history
- Used by: 50-100 m air rifle shooters

Production history
- Manufacturer: Klimovsk Specialized Ammunition Plant

Specifications
- Mass: 3.2 kg (7.1 lb) (no sights)
- Length: 920 mm (36.22 in)
- Barrel length: 552 mm (21.73 in)
- Cartridge: 4.5 mm (0.177 in) diabolo air gun pellets 5.5 mm (0.217 in) diabolo air gun pellets 6.35 mm (0.250 in) diabolo air gun pellets
- Action: Pre-Charged Pneumatic
- Muzzle velocity: 275 m/s (adjustable 250-300 m/s)
- Effective firing range: 100 m (109.4 yd)
- Maximum firing range: 140 m (153.1 yd)
- Feed system: single air gun pellet magazines 8/10/12 pellets
- Sights: optical

Jäger (German for "hunter") is a PCP air gun (rifle), manufactured by Klimovsk Specialized Ammunition Plant in Russia. It is used for target shooting or hunting for birds and small animals at a distance up to 100 m. It was presented in autumn 2010 at the exhibition Arms&Hunting 2010.

== Description ==
The rifle is equipped with a barrel produced by German company Lothar Walther with a choke.

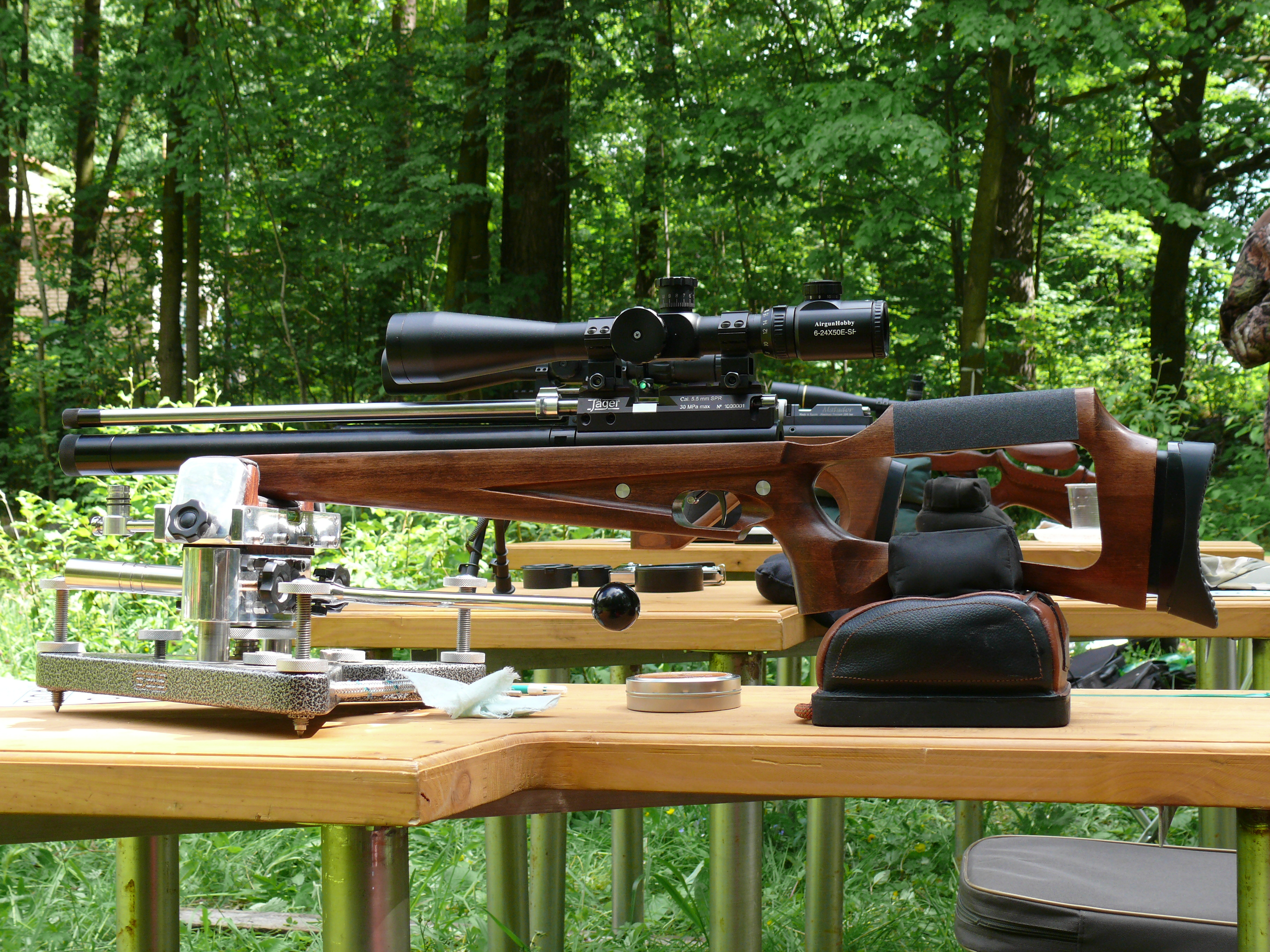

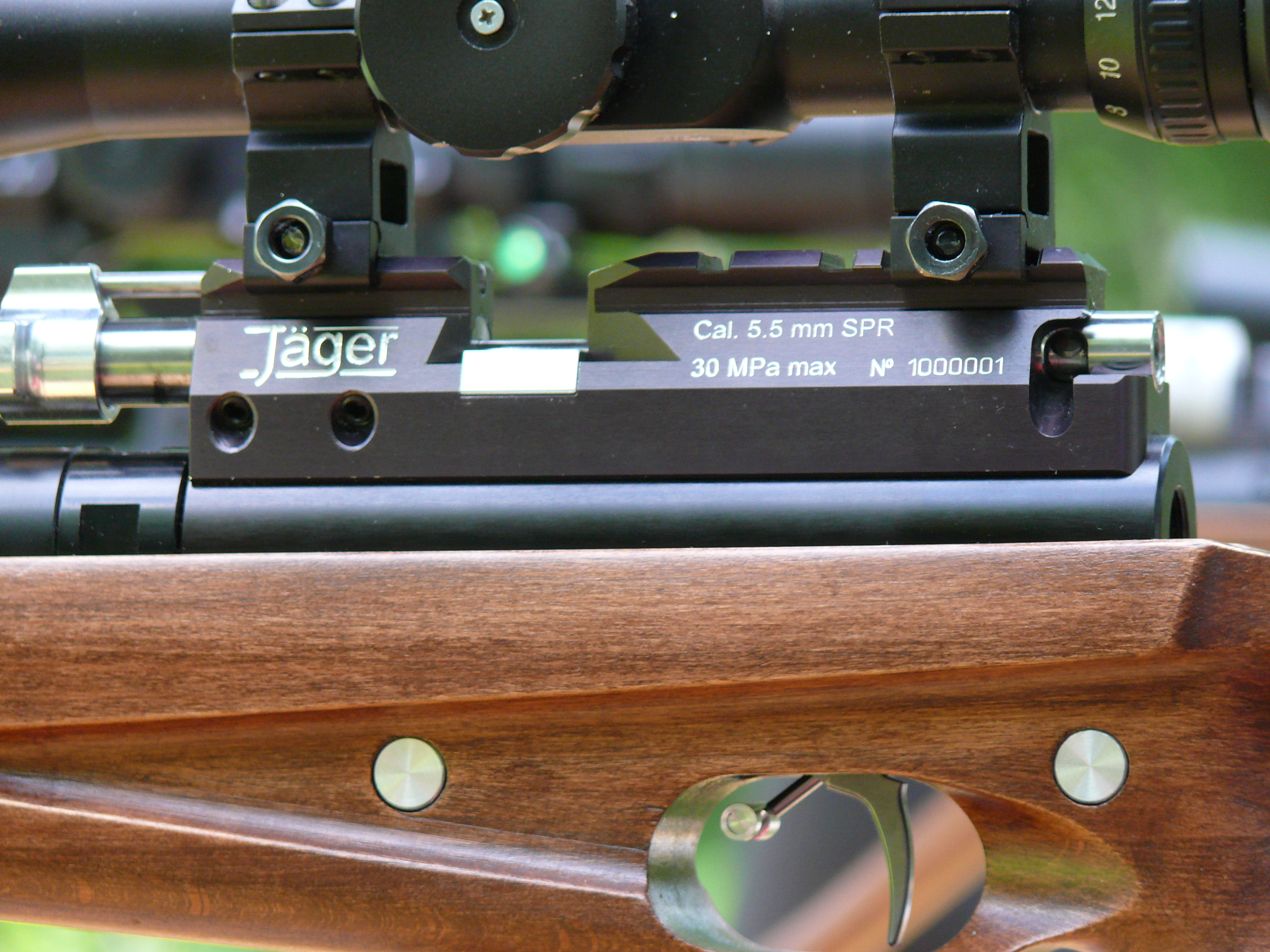

== Details ==
Model	5.5 SPR	5.5 XPR	4.5 MPR	4.5 MPR FT	5.5 SP	5.5 XP	6.35 SP	6.35 XPR
Calibre, mm	5,5	5,5	4,5	4,5	5,5	5,5	6,35	6,35
Shot energy, J, up to	3,0	25	7,5	7,5	3,0	25	3,0	25
Air reservoir volume, cm^{3}	188	188	188	188	268	268	212	212
Magazine capacity, pellets	10	10	12	—	10	10	8	8
Maximum permissible air pressure, MPa, less	30	30	30	30	22	22	22	30
Barrel length, mm	492	492	477	442	552	552	552	552
Weight without sights, kg, less	3.2							

== See also ==
- Klimovsk Specialized Ammunition Plant
- Horhe
