= Peterson v Minister of Safety & Security =

South African legal case

Peterson v Minister of Safety and Security
- Court: Supreme Court of Appeal of South Africa
- Full case name: Petersen v Minister of Safety and Security
- Decided: 10 September 2009
- Citations: [2010] 1 All SA 19 (SCA); Case No. 514/08

Court membership
- Judges sitting: FDJ Brand, JA Heher, S Snyders JJA, NV Hurt and ZL Tshiqi AJJA

Case opinions
- Decision by: Brand JA

Keywords
- Delict, Claim for damages, Personal injury, Defence of necessity, Onus, Police, Wrongfulness

Peterson v Minister of Safety and Security is an important case in South African criminal law. For the appellant appeared J Whitehead SC, instructed by JL Martinson & Company, Cape Town; for the respondents, A Schippers SC and S O'Brien, instructed by the State Attorney, Cape Town.

== Facts ==
In 2002, the police attempted to seize at least twenty bags of illegally harvested abalone or perlemoen in an area infamous for perlemoen poaching. During that exercise, a belligerent crowd gathered, opposing the removal of the haul by the police. The crowd then began stoning the police, forcing their retreat. That allowed the crowd to make off with most of the bags of perlemoen. In the course of the altercation between the crowd and the police, the latter attempted to stave off the attack by firing rubber bullets into the crowd. When the police ran out of rubber bullets, they started shooting into the ground near the crowd with sharp-point ammunition from their firearms.

The appellant sued the respondent for damages sustained by her son in the above-mentioned shooting. The respondent raised the defence of justification in the form of self-defence, alternatively necessity. The plea of necessity was upheld by the trial court, which led to the dismissal of the appellant's claim, with costs. The present appeal ensued.

== Argument ==
Much more was said by the appellant on appeal, in the numerous contradictions between the police witnesses on matters of detail. The appellant asked the court to conclude, from the contradictions, that the version of the police witnesses could not be accepted.

== Judgment ==
The court, however, found the contradictions between the police witnesses to bear the hallmarks of honest mistakes. They were patently immaterial and were of a kind that may result from erroneous observation in a confused situation. The court cited the judgment of Nicholas J in S v Oosthuizen:

Where the [contradicting] statements are made by different persons, the contradiction in itself proves only that one of them is erroneous: it does not prove which one. It follows that the mere fact of the contradiction does not support any conclusion as to the credibility of either person. It acquires probative value only if the contradicting witness is believed in preference to the first witness, that is, if the error of the first witness is established [....] Plainly it is not every error made by a witness which affects his credibility. In each case the trier of fact has to make an evaluation; taking into account such matters as the nature of the contradictions, their number and importance, and their bearing on other parts of the witness's evidence.

The court did find, however, that the appellant's son was an unsatisfactory witness. He was clearly attempting to disassociate himself from the crowd, and in doing so ended up denying things that were fairly common cause.

The question remaining was whether, in the circumstances, the police action which caused the appellant's son's injuries did not attract liability because it was justified in circumstances of necessity. Unlike self-defence, the defence of necessity does not require that the defendant's action be directed at a wrongful attacker. There was, therefore, no need for the respondent to establish that the appellant's son was himself part of the attacking crowd.

What the respondent had to prove in order to establish the justification defence of necessity, appeared in broad outline, from the following statements in by JR Midgley and JC van der Walt:

An act of necessity can be described as lawful conduct directed against an innocent person for the purpose of protecting an interest of the actor or a third party [...] against a dangerous situation [....]

Whether a situation of necessity existed is a factual question which must be determined objectively [....]

A person may inflict harm in a situation of necessity only if the danger existed, or was imminent, and he or she has no other reasonable means of averting the danger [....]

The means used and measures taken to avert the danger of harm must not have been excessive, having regard to all the circumstances of the case [....]

Based on the facts, the court agreed with the finding of both the trial court and the court a quo: that the respondent had discharged the onus of establishing that the conduct of the police officers, which caused the complainant's injuries, was not wrongful, as their actions were justified by necessity.

The appeal was thus dismissed with costs.

== See also ==
- South African criminal law
