= Baton round =

Impact munition used in riot control

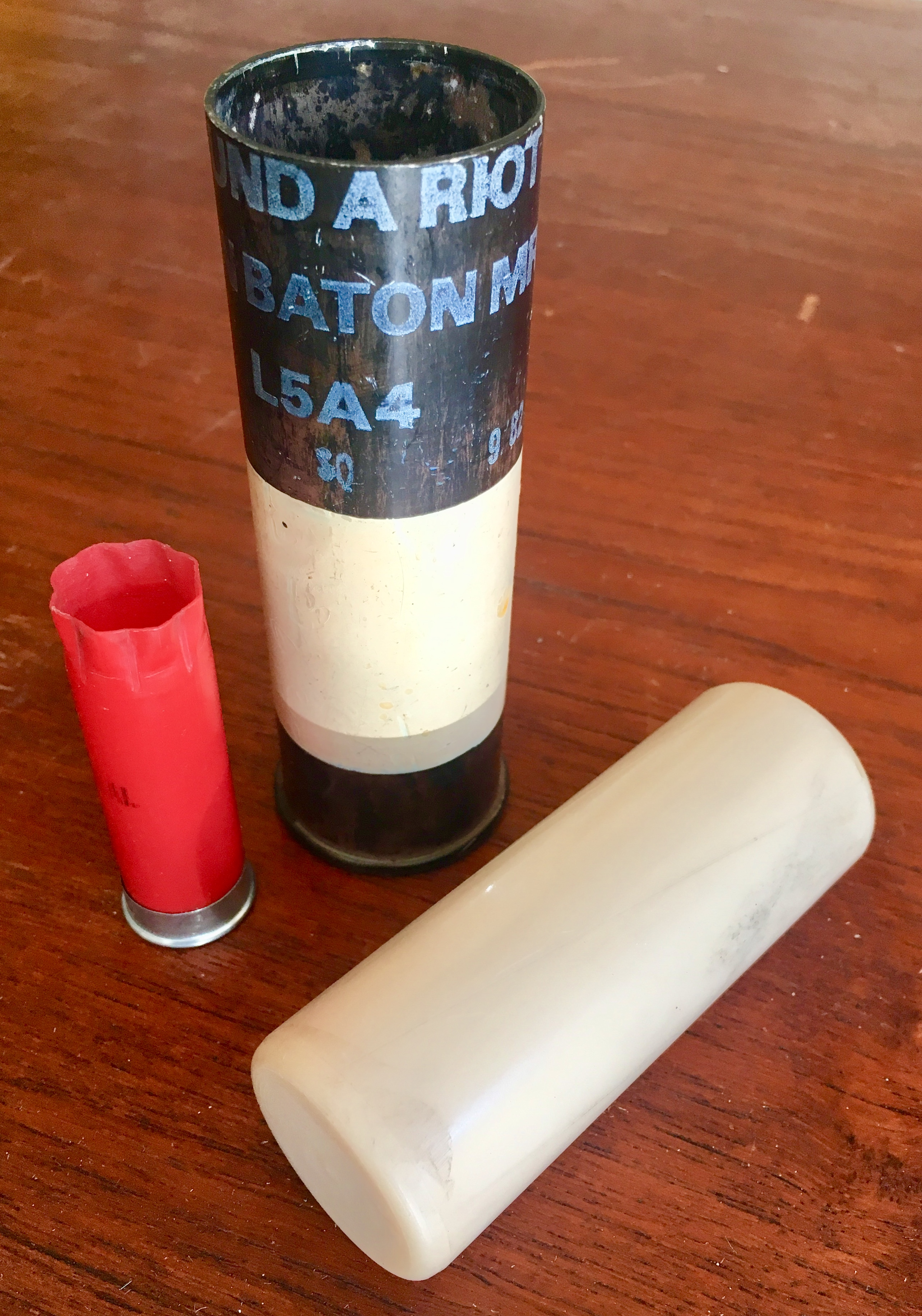
A 37 mm (1.5 in) L5A4 United Kingdom issue baton round, with a 12GA shotgun cartridge for scale

Baton rounds, also known as kinetic impact projectiles (KIPs), are a less lethal alternative to traditional bullets. Baton rounds are designed to impact rather than to penetrate and are typically used for riot control.

Common types of baton round have included the:

- Bean bag round, a less-lethal projectile fired from a normal 12-gauge shotgun
- Plastic baton round or plastic bullet, a less-lethal projectile fired from a specialised gun
- Rubber baton round, commonly called the rubber bullet, a rubber-coated projectile with a metal or ceramic core.
- Wooden baton round (which are meant to be skipped off the ground into the targeted area), also called a wooden bullet (a bullet is a direct impact round).
- Foam baton round, also called a sponge grenade

Such munitions are meant to cause pain and incapacitation but not penetrate flesh. However, baton rounds can cause death and serious injuries such as damage to internal organs, permanent disabilities including blindness, especially when fired from close range at the head, neck, chest, or abdomen.

== History ==
The use of baton rounds dates back to the 1880s, when Singapore police fired sections of broom handle at demonstrators in Singapore. The Hong Kong police subsequently developed wooden baton rounds, but they were likely to splinter and cause wounds.

Baton rounds, in the form of the Rubber bullet round were used extensively by the British Army against rioters in Northern Ireland during The Troubles, from 1970.

"Rubber bullets", with their pointed tips, tended to bounce uncontrollably, and were replaced by shorter, denser, plastic baton rounds like the L5A4: solid PVC cylinders 10 cm long, 38 mm in diameter, and weighing 135g. They were invented by Porton Down scientists and intended for use against rioters in Northern Ireland, first used there in 1973.

== Injuries ==
In a 1975 study of injuries in 90 patients injured by baton rounds, 1 died, 17 suffered permanent disabilities or deformities and 41 required hospital treatment after being fired upon with baton rounds. A review of studies covering multiple different munition types/designs, which covered 1,984 people injured by "kinetic impact projectiles" and found that 53 died, plus 300 permanently disabled. Baton rounds can cause blindness as shown by their use by police in the 2019-2020 Chilean protests. During the first 3–4 months of protests in Chile, baton rounds contributed to have a toll of 427 persons with eye injuries, an extremely high number when comparing to other protests or conflict zones in the world.

== See also ==
- Baton charge, a coordinated tactic for dispersing crowds of people
- Baton (law enforcement)
