= Makarych =

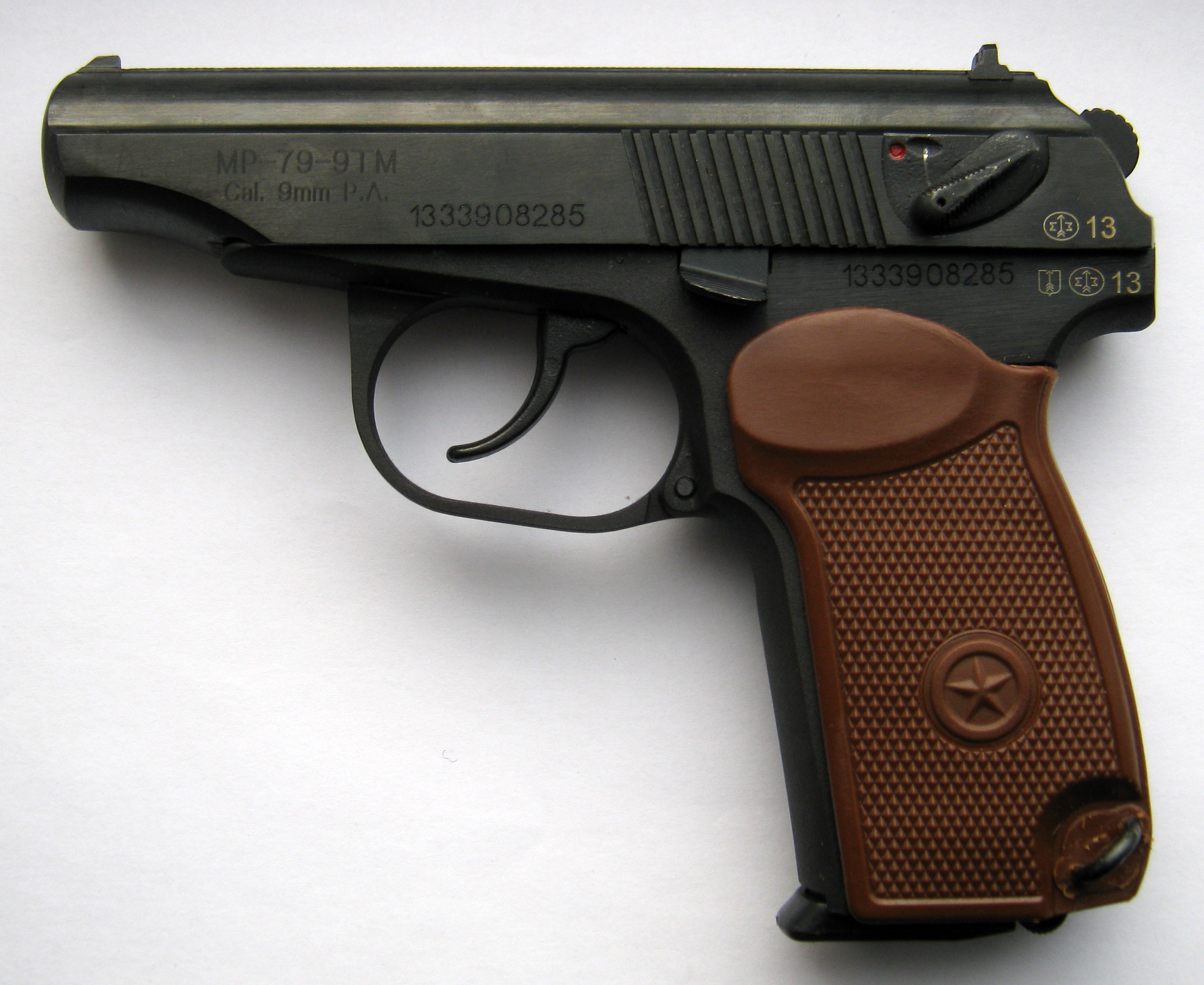
- Type: Non-lethal pistol
- Place of origin: Russia

Production history
- Produced: 2004 -

Specifications
- Barrel length: 93 mm
- Cartridge: 9 mm P.A.
- Action: double action
- Effective firing range: 10 meters

The "Makarych" (Russian: "Макарыч") is a family of Russian non-lethal gas pistols with the ability to fire ammunition with rubber bullets.

== Design ==
It was developed jointly by the ZAO TSSZ "Kolchuga" and FGUP Izhevsk Mechanical Plant and is based on the Soviet Makarov pistol.

== Variants ==
=== Izhevsk Mechanical Plant ===
English	Russian	Production date	Cartridge	Magazine	Notes	Reference
IZH-79-9T "Makarych"	ИЖ-79-9Т «Макарыч»	2004	9mm P.A.	8-round	First model	
IZH-79-9TM "Makarych"	ИЖ-79-9ТМ	2006	9mm P.A.	8-round	Second model, produced as "МР-79-9ТМ" ("МП-79-9ТМ") since September 2008	
MP-471	МП-471	2005	10x23 mm	8-round	Available only for private security companies	
IZH-79-9TM-10	ИЖ-79-9ТМ-10	Unknown	9mm P.A.	10-round	Produced as "МР-79-9ТМ-10" ("МП-79-9ТМ-10") since September 2008	
МР-80-13Т	МП-80-13T	Unknown	.45 Rubber	6-round	New model	

=== Ukrainian derivatives ===
Several Ukrainian manufacturers converts Soviet Makarov pistols into non-lethal gas pistols with the ability to fire ammunition with rubber bullets:

English	Ukrainian	Cartidge	Magazine	Producer	Location	Notes	Reference
Berkut	Беркут	9mm P.A.	8-round	OOO "Berkut"	Dnipro	1257 copies made	
PMR	ПМР	9mm P.A.	8-round	OOO "SOBR"	Kharkiv		
PMR .45 Rubber	ПМР .45 Rubber	.45 Rubber	6-round	OOO "SOBR"	Kharkiv		
PM-RF	ПМ-РФ	9mm P.A.	8-round	RPC Fort	Vinnytsia		
PM-T	ПМ-Т	9mm P.A.	8-round	ERMA-Inter	Kyiv		
PM-GT	ПМ-ГТ	9mm P.A.	8-round	ERMA-Inter	Kyiv		
PMSh-1	ПМШ1	9mm P.A.	8-round	OOO UNSP «Шмайсер»	Vasylkiv		

== Legal status ==
- Kazakhstan - The use of non-lethal weapons in Kazakhstan is permitted to civil population, and it is also used by private security guards
- Russia - The use of non-lethal weapons in Russia is permitted to civil population, and it is also used by private security. A permit to purchase, possess, or carry a self-defense non-lethal weapon must be obtained from the police department.
- Ukraine - Ukrainian pistols are allowed for private security guards

== See also ==
- Fort-12
- Fort-17
- Makarov pistol

== Sources ==
- К. И. Куценко, И. Ю. Макаров. Возможности судебно-медицинской оценки повреждений одежды, причинённых холостым выстрелом из пистолета MP-79-TM // журнал «Судебно-медицинская экспертиза», No. 2, 2013. стр.7-11
