= Rubber bullet =

Less-lethal projectile

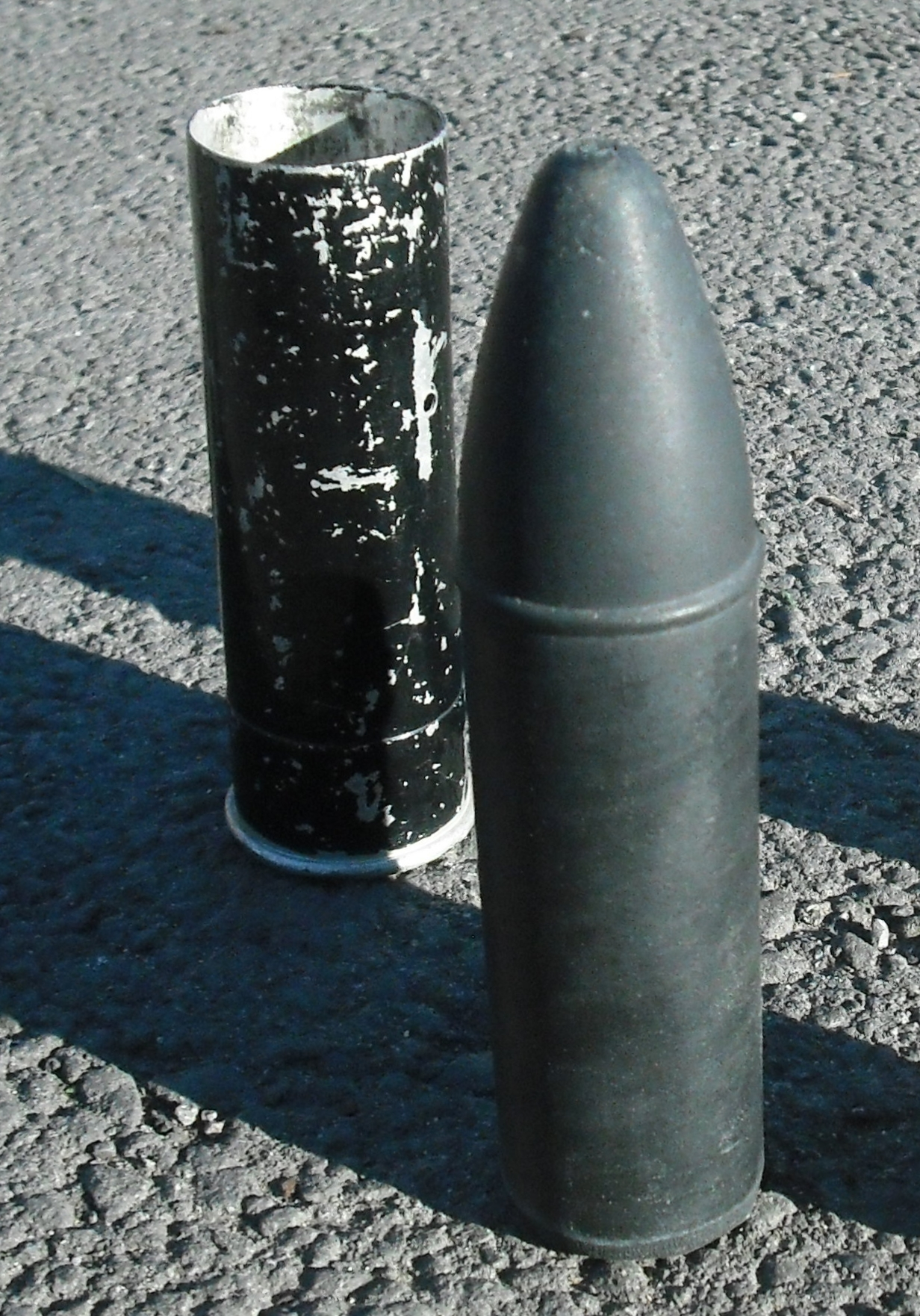
"Round, Anti-Riot, 1.5in Baton" 37 mm British Army rubber bullet, as used in Northern Ireland from 1970 to 1975

Rubber bullets (also called rubber baton rounds) are a type of baton round. Despite the name, rubber bullets typically have either a metal core with a rubber coating, or are a homogeneous admixture with rubber being a minority component. Although they are considered a less lethal alternative to metal projectiles, rubber bullets can still cause fatal injuries as well as other serious injuries such as blindness or other permanent disabilities.

Like other similar projectiles made from plastic, wax, and wood, rubber bullets may be used for short range practice and animal control, but are most commonly used in riot control and to disperse protests.

Rubber bullets were invented by the British Ministry of Defence for riot control purposes in Northern Ireland during the Troubles, and were first used there in 1970.

Rubber projectiles have largely been replaced by other materials, as rubber tends to bounce uncontrollably.

== Composition and physical properties ==
Analysis of the composition of the "rubber" pellets used by Chilean police shows that 80% of the pellets is made up of hard substances, chiefly silica and barium sulfate, while rubber makes up 20%. The measured hardness of the "rubber" pellets is 96.5 shore A. The hardness of the pellets explain why "exploded eyes" were so common in the 2019–2020 Chilean protests.

== Uses ==
=== Riot control ===
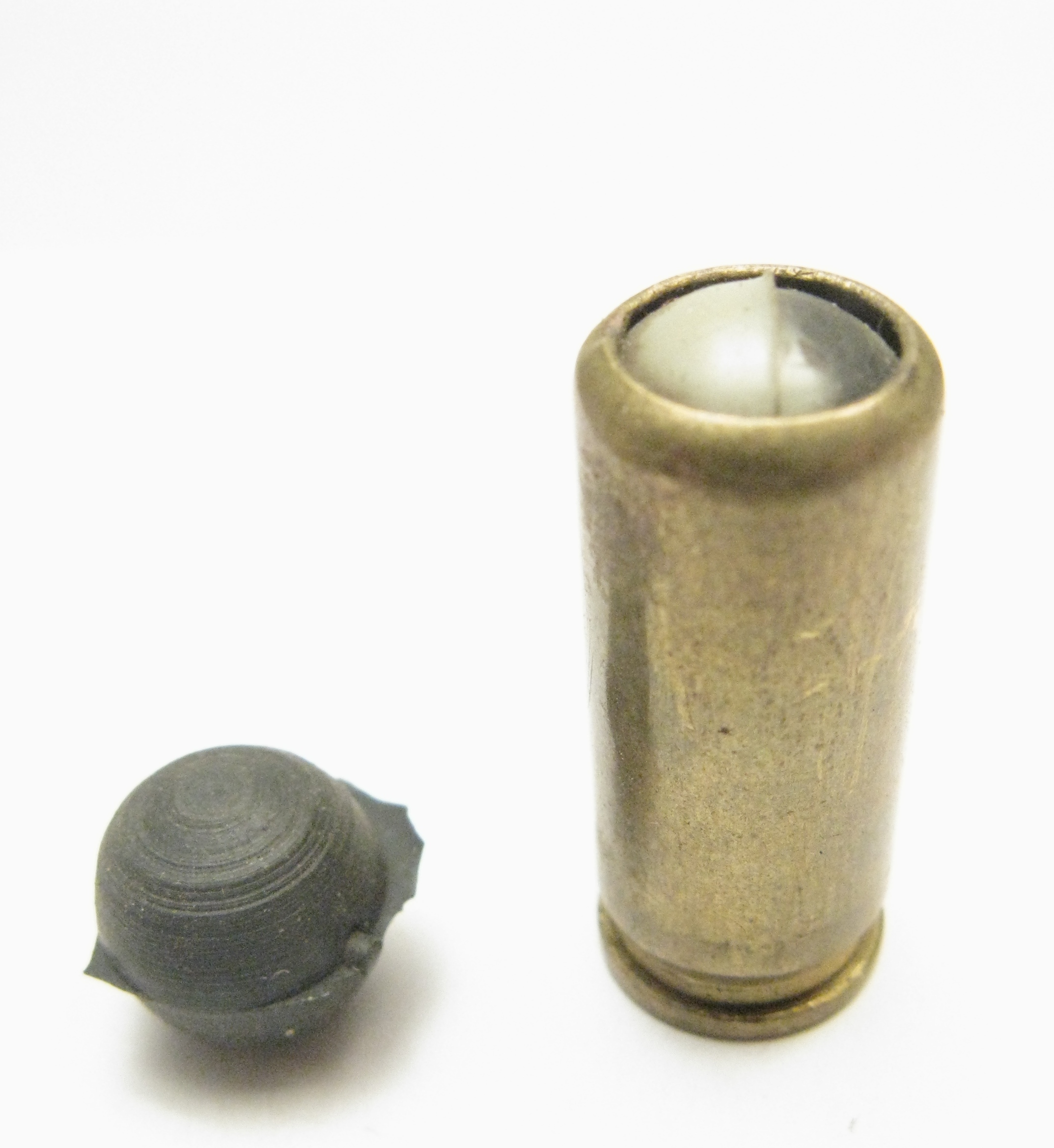
9mm P.A. cartridge with rubber bullet

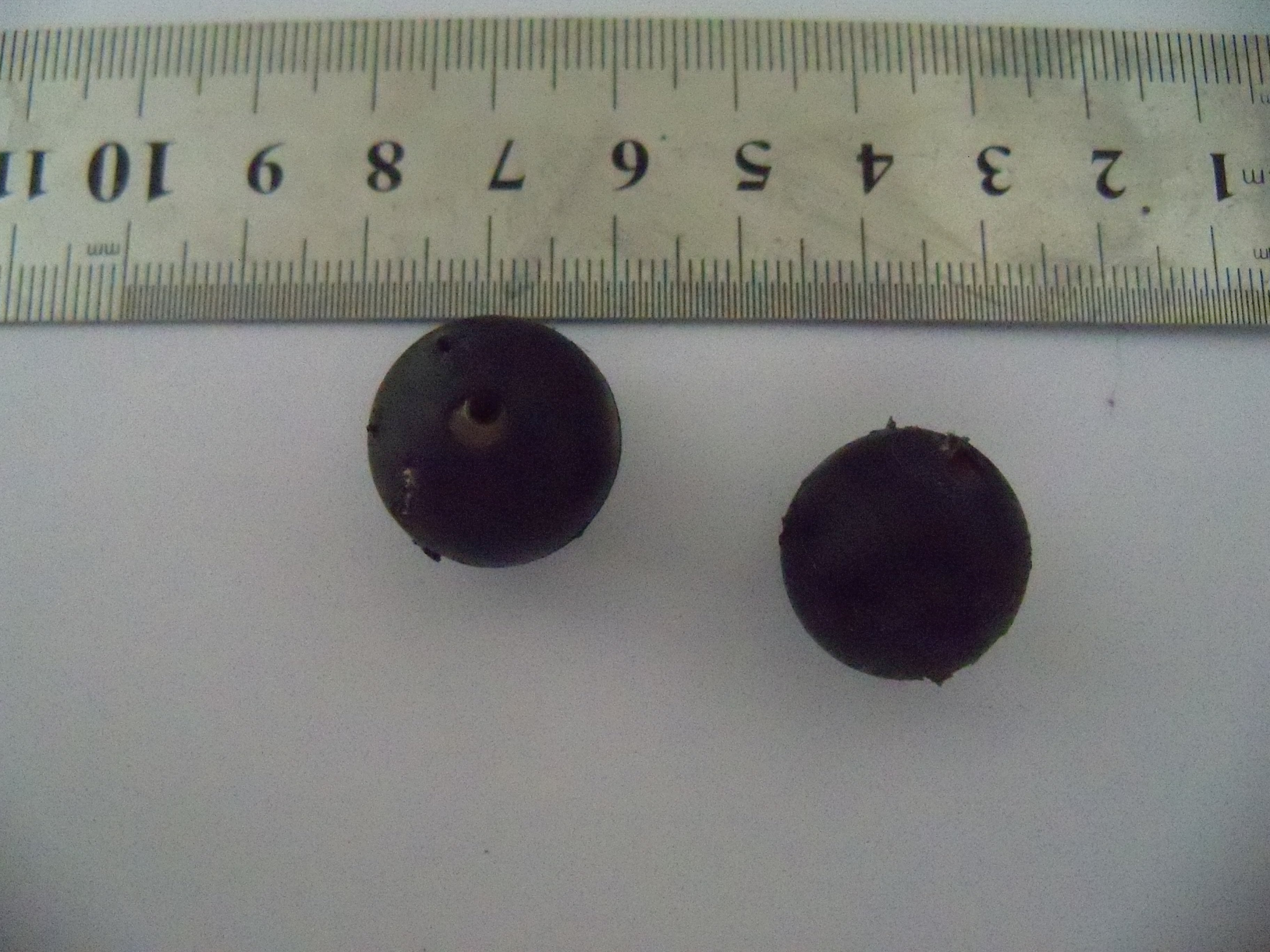
Rubber balls used against protesters in Ni'lin, August 2013

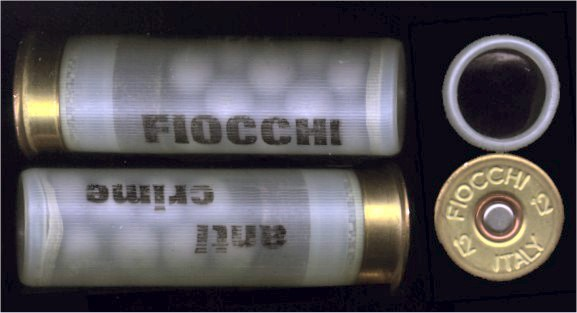
Two shells of Fiocchi 12 gauge rubber buckshot

The British Ministry of Defence developed rubber rounds—the "Round, Anti-Riot, 1.5in Baton"—in 1970 for riot control purposes in Northern Ireland during The Troubles. A low power propelling charge gave them a muzzle velocity of about 60 m/s (200 ft/s) and maximum range of about 100 m (110 yd)."The round is generally deployed in low trajectories or skip fired in the general direction (non-target specific) of the intended targets," causing pain but not injury, but is also intended to be direct fired at the discretion of the operator. From 1970 to 1975, about 55,000 rubber bullets were fired by the British Army in Northern Ireland. The bullets were intended to be fired at the legs of rioters or the ground in front of rioters where it would bounce, losing some of its velocity, and then hit the intended target. However, rubber bullets were often fired by security forces directly at people from close range, resulting in a number of individuals being killed or wounded. Humans rights campaigner and co-founder of United Campaign Against Plastic Bullets Emma Groves was blinded by a rubber bullet in 1971. In 1975, they were replaced by plastic bullets. In Northern Ireland over 35 years (1970–2005), about 125,000 rubber and plastic bullets were fired—an average of ten per day—causing 17 deaths.

The baton round was made available to British police forces outside Northern Ireland from 2001. In 2013 however, Ministry of Defence papers declassified from 1977 revealed it was aware rubber bullets were more dangerous than was publicly disclosed. The documents contained legal advice for the MoD to seek a settlement over a child who had been blinded in 1972, rather than go to court which would expose problems with the bullets and make it harder to fight future related cases. The papers stated that further tests would reveal serious problems with the bullets, including that they were tested "in a shorter time than was ideal", that they "could be lethal" and that they "could and did cause serious injuries".

Israeli rubber bullets are produced in two main types. The older type, the standard rubber bullet, is a steel sphere coated in a thin layer of rubber, weighing 14 grams, while the newly improved rubber bullet, introduced in 1989, is a rubber-coated metal cylinder 1.7 cm in diameter, weighing 15.4 grams. Of the lethal injuries from this projectile, most are suffered to the head.

Smaller rubber bullets are used in riot shotguns and are available in a variety of types. One company, for example, makes both rubber buckshot rounds, containing fifteen 8.3mm diameter rubber balls per cartridge, and rubber baton rounds, containing a single 4.75 gram projectile.

Head injury from rubber bullet shot at a Palestinian demonstrator in Kafr Qaddum, West Bank, by IDF

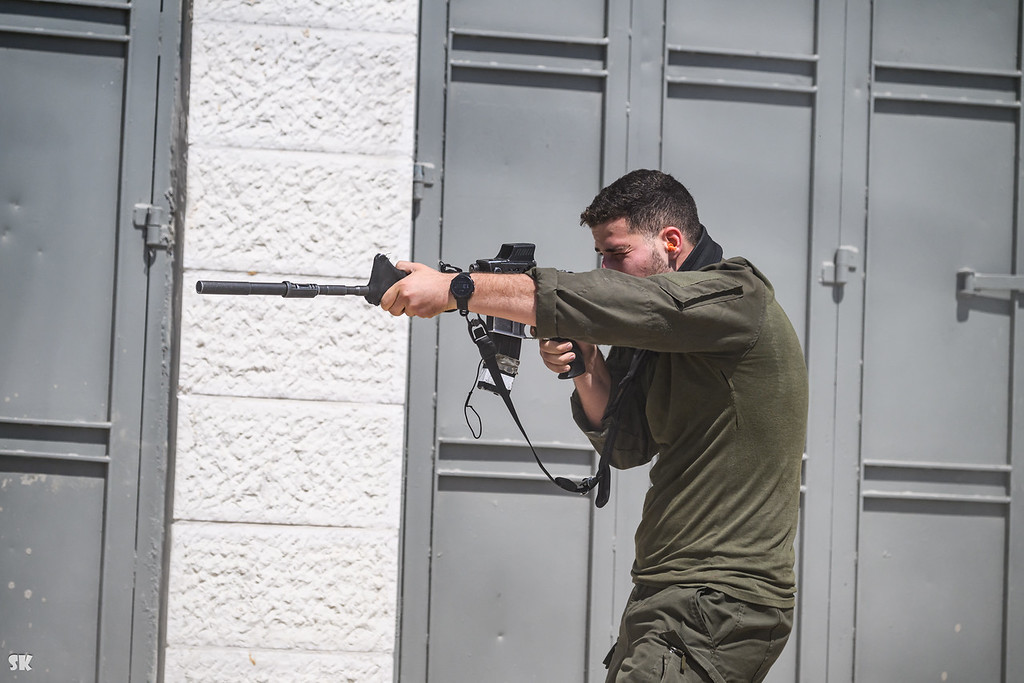
An Israeli soldier shooting rubber bullets at protestors at Kafr Qaddum, September 2023

Israeli security forces used less-lethal weapons including rubber bullets in an operation on 28 February 2011 to demolish illegal structures in the West Bank settlement of Havat Gilad.

=== Self-defence ===
In some countries, less-lethal guns that fire rubber projectiles may be used by civilians for self-defence.

- Kazakhstan – Private security guards are allowed to carry less-lethal gas pistols with the ability to fire rubber bullets for the purpose of self defence.
- Romania – Rubber bullet guns can be owned in the country by private individuals for the purpose of self-defence.
- Russia – Since 1999, the civil population, private security officers, and law control forces in Russia are permitted to use less-lethal weapons. A variety of handguns (Osa, Makarych, Horhe, etc.) are carried with specially weakened construction and barrel with internal lugs, making use of full-power loads and/or firing hard projectiles impossible, while rubber bullets just compress when passing the lug and so may be fired. Most common calibres are 9 mm and 10 mm with muzzle velocity sometimes almost matching normal handguns and bullets as light as 0.7 g.
- Ukraine – Security guards may use less-lethal gas pistols with the ability to fire ammunition with rubber bullets.

=== Recreation ===
Rubber bullets, powered only by primer, are usually used for short-range indoor target practice or training, generally with handguns. They are intended only for target shooting, unlike paintballs or airsoft pellets, which are intended for use on suitably protected live targets. Rubber bullets, if used with a suitable backstop, can be recovered undamaged after firing, and reused many times.

== See also ==
- Bean bag round
- Plastic bullet
- Ring airfoil projectile
- Sponge grenade
- Wax bullet
- Wooden bullet
