= Klimovsk Specialized Ammunition Plant =

Coordinates: 55°22′43″N 37°32′55″E

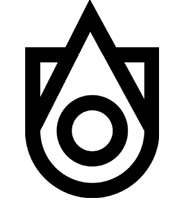
- Company type: Closed Joint-Stock Company
- Industry: Defence industry
- Founded: 1936
- Headquarters: Klimovsk, Russia
- Products: Ammunition and weapons
- Website: eng.kspz.ru new.kspz.ru

Klimovsk Specialized Ammunition Plant (CJSC KSAP) (Russian: Климовский специализированный патронный завод, romanized: Klimovskiy spetsializirovannyy patronnyy zavod) is an ammunition enterprise located in Russian town Klimovsk near Podolsk in the Moscow region. 7.62×39mm cartridges and wide variety of other service cartridges for various Russian handguns are produced.

== History ==
In 1936, a new ammunition plant construction was launched near Podolsk. It was named “Novopodolsky” and on December 30 of the same year was tagged with an official number – 711. By the late 1930s, the Novopodolskiy plant had mastered the full production cycle of the cartridges most needed in the army: rifle (7.62×54mmR) and pistol (7.62×25mm) ammunition. By 1941, the plant had started producing pyrotechnical compounds and, to add to that, six more types of cartridges of calibers 7.62 mm and 12.7 mm. Among those listed were the munitions used for feeding renowned Mosin–Nagant rifles, TT pistols, Nagant revolvers and DShK heavy machine-guns, among others.

Besides, in 1943 a scientific research institute for cartridge design (NII-44) was established on the base of the plant. In the war years, despite the wartime hardships and following a great increase in both new and existing firearms production, the facility output increased nineteenfold. For its achievements during the war, the plant staff was awarded the Order of the Patriotic War, 1st Degree. In 1960 the plant was renamed “Klimovsk Stamping Plant” (KSP). In the same period, 1950–60's, experimental automated manufacture of then-standard intermediate cartridges in 7.62×39mm was launched at the plant. 7.62×39mm rounds are the ammunition for the famed AK-47 series of assault rifles. They are still widely used today, both for old military designs and new professional and amateur hunting rifles, which is reflected in factory's production.

In 2000, the cartridges with nickel-plated casing were presented at the international weapon exhibition IWA & OutdoorClassics in Nuremberg, Germany, followed by an export contract. Later on, the plant proceeded with producing six modifications of 7.62×39mm cartridges with bimetallic case. About the same time, sport pistol cartridges of KSP brand appear: 9 × 19 “Parabellum” and 9 × 18 “Makarov”; hunting rifle cartridges caliber 5.56 “Magnum”, 5.56×45mm of .223 Remington type, 7.62 × 51 of .308 Winchester type; a 1943 submachine gun cartridge with a bullet of increased penetration power. These cartridges aroused vivid interest with foreign customers.

A closed-type joint stock company (ZAO), Klimovsk Specialized Ammunition Plant, was founded in 2001 on the base of OAO KSP. Following the new trend of traumatic (which means non-lethal, rubber-bullet, obstructed-barrel) handguns being widely marketed in Russia with notable success, the factory began producing traumatic cartridges to keep up with the demand. Following the Russia-Ukraine war, the company has become a 'sanctioned entity' because its activities directly enhance the Russian military fighting capabilities. CJSC Klimovsk Specialized Cartridge Plant is therefore supporting materially and benefitting from the Government of the Russian Federation, which is deemed responsible by Western powers for the annexation of Crimea and the destabilisation of Ukraine.

== Production ==
=== Cartridges ===
Note: SP stands for Специальный патрон – "Special Cartridge"; the designation started with SP-1, the 1950s experiment with piston-type silent cartridge. The SP-4 was developed for PSS silent pistol and the NRS-1 scout shooting knife. The SP-5 and SP-6 cartridges were developed for special purpose VSS Vintorez and AS Val weapon systems.

- 9×18mm 'SP7' pistol cartridge, hollow-point bullet with a polyethylene plug in the expansion cavity
- 7.62×3mm 'SP4' silent piston gas-containing pistol cartridge
- 9×18mm 'SP8' low-penetration (plane hostage crisis scenario) pistol cartridge
- 9×39mm 'SP6' subsonic sniper cartridge with armor-piercing steel-core bullet
- 9×39mm 'SP5' subsonic sniper cartridge
- 7.62mm model 1943 cartridge with steel core bullet
- 9×19mm 'Parabellum' pistol cartridge
- 9×17mm 'Kurz' pistol cartridge

=== Hunting ===
- 7.62×39mm FMJ hunting cartridge with 8 g bullet
- 7.62×39mm FMJ hunting cartridge with 9 g bullet
- 7.62×39mm HP hunting cartridge with 8 g bullet
- 7.62×39mm HP hunting cartridge with 9 g bullet
- 7.62×39mm SP hunting cartridge with 8 g bullet

=== Small-caliber ===
- 5.6 mm 'Record' rifle cartridge (.22 LR)
- 5.6 mm 'Record-Bi' rifle cartridge (.22 LR)
- 5.6 mm 'Temp' rifle cartridge (.22 LR)
- 5.6 mm 'Strandard' rifle cartridge (.22 LR)
- 5.6 mm 'Standard-L' rifle cartridge (.22 LR)
- 5.6 mm 'Okhotnik' rifle cartridge (.22 LR)
- 5.6 mm 'Match' rifle cartridge (.22 LR)
- 5.6 mm 'Biathlon' rifle cartridge (.22 LR)
- 5.6 mm 'Temp' pistol cartridge (.22 LR)
- 5.6 mm 'Temp-PU' pistol cartridge (.22 Short)

=== Industrial ===
- 6.8/11 industrial cartridges
- 6.8/18 industrial cartridges

=== Traumatic (non-lethal) ===
- 9.0 mm P.A. Trenirovochnye (Training) cartridges - 70 J
- 9.0 mm P.A. Trenirovochnye (Training) cartridges - 91 J
- 9.0 mm P.A. Uboynye (Lethal) cartridges
- 9.0 mm P.A. Uboynye + (Enhanced Lethal) cartridges

=== BB Pellets ===
- 4.5 mm ‘Diablo-1’ bullets
- 4.5 mm ‘DC’ bullets
- 4.5 mm ‘DC-M’ bullets

== Weapons ==
- Horhe ("Хорхе") non-lethal pistols (since 2006)
- KSPZ Jäger - pre-charged pneumatic (PCP) rifle
