= Zoraki =

Starting/Blank gun brand

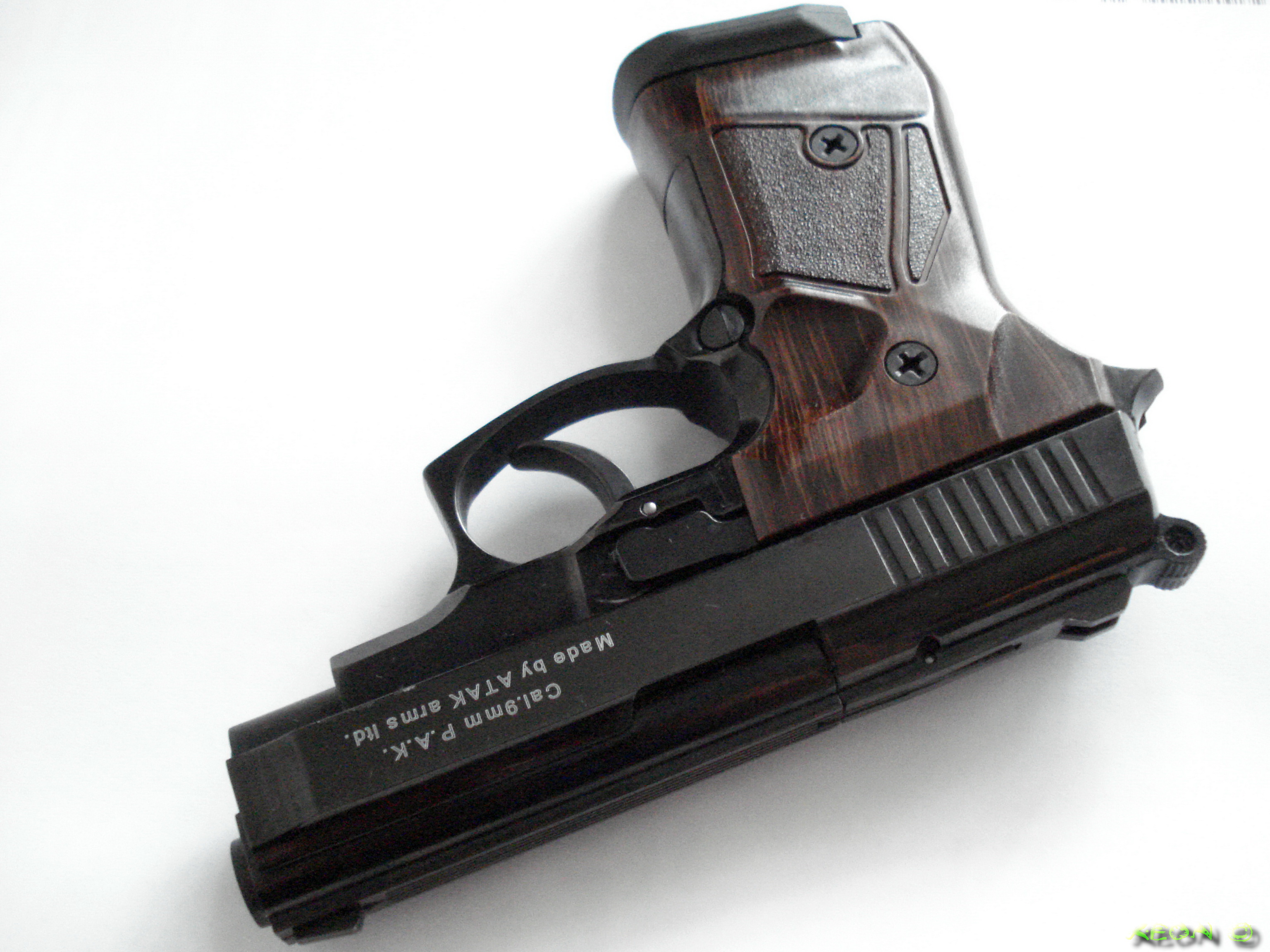
A semiautomatic pistol chambered for 9mm P.A.K.

An overview of a Zoraki 925 chambered for 9mm P.A.K.

Zoraki is a brand of Starting pistols and airguns manufactured by Atak Arms in Turkey. They commonly produce fully automatic blank guns that are legal in many European countries, imitation replicas of popular firearms such as Glocks, Uzi, Beretta 92, and more.

== Models ==
- M906: Generic Subcompact Semi-automatic pistol chambered for 9mm PAK.
  - M807: 8mm PAK version
  - M2906: Second generation
    - M2807: 8mm PAK version
- 914: Generic Compact Semi-Automatic pistol chambered for 9mm PAK, some models can be fully-automatic
  - 2914: Second generation, cannot go full auto
- 917: Glock 17 semi-automatic replica in 9mm PAK, banned to import in the United States due to copyright violations.
- 918: Beretta 92 semi-automatic replica in 9mm PAK
  - 2918: Second generation, doesn't resemble any existing firearm.
  - 4918: Fourth generation, doesn't resemble any existing firearm.
- 925: Generic Uzi-style SMG chambered for 9mm PAK and has the ability to go fully automatic

== Legal issues ==
=== Legality ===
On June 23, 2011, the RCMP declared Zoraki models 914 and 925 as prohibited firearms in Canada for being fully automatic despite not legally being considered a firearm.

=== Lawsuits ===
In 2010, Glock sued Austrian Sporting Arms and ISSC Handels GmbH for trade dress infringement, it was settled out of court.

In 2017, an importer of Zoraki blank guns in the United States, Maxwell Corp, was sued by Glock for trade dress infringement for importing an unlicensed glock imitation model.
