= 9mm P.A.K. =

German non-lethal pistol cartridge

9mm P.A.
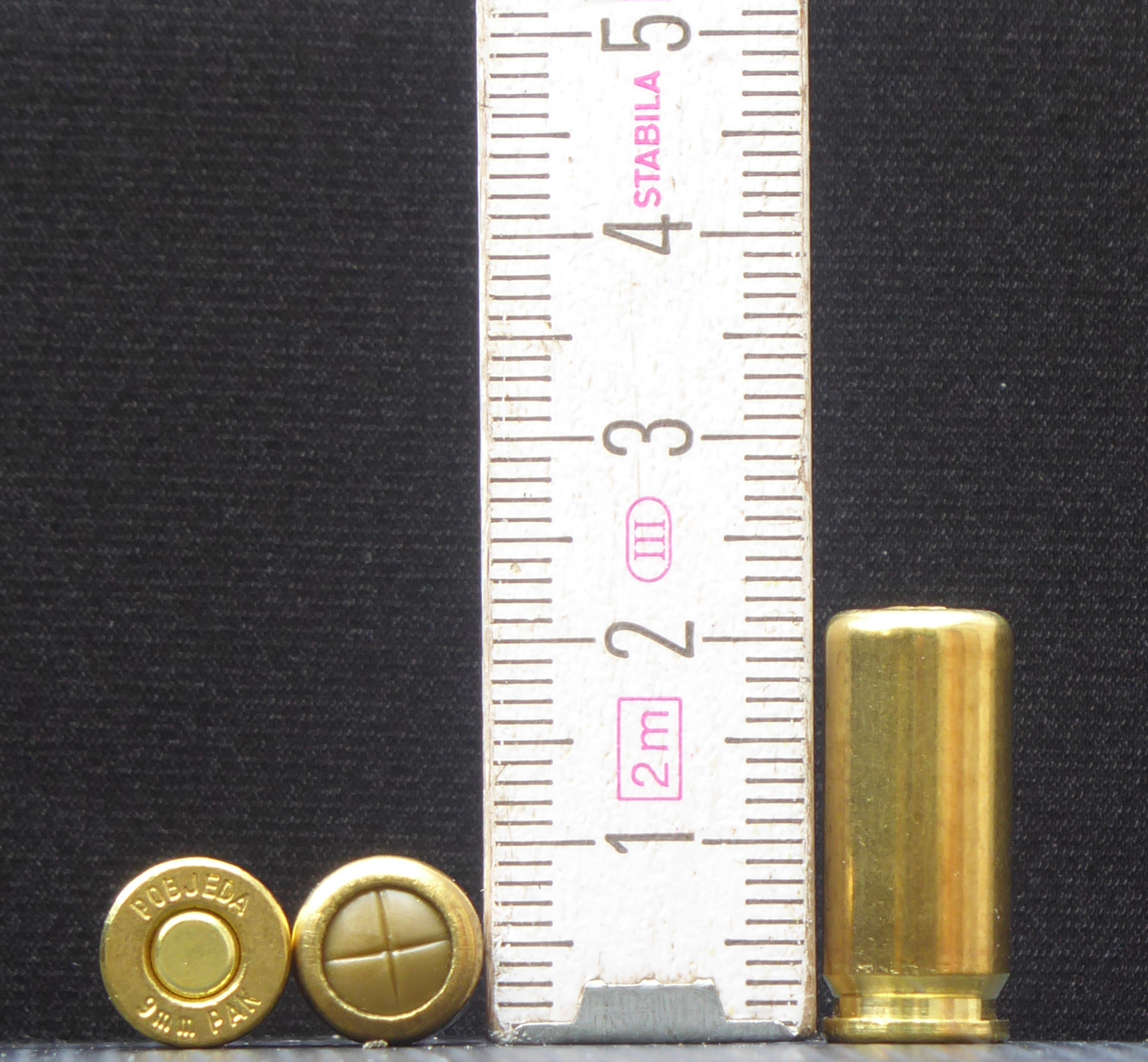
- 9×22mm P.A. cartridge with brass case
- Type: Semi-automatic pistol
- Place of origin: Germany

Specifications
- Parent case: 9×19mm Parabellum
- Case type: Rimless, straightwalled
- Rim diameter: 9 mm
- Case length: 22 mm
- Primer type: Small pistol

9mm P.A. (Pistole Automatik, German for "automatic pistol"), 9×22mm or 9mm P.A.K. (Pistole Automatik Knall, "pistol/automatic/bang") is a firearm cartridge for a non-lethal gas pistol noisemaking gun. Caliber 9mm P.A. includes various blank, gas or rubber ammunitions made for different use.

9mm P.A. Blank has also been used for theatrical purposes, including as a modification to muzzle-loading firearms, allowing early-modern muskets and the like to be fired on-stage without the actors learning the complex steps of loading with loose powder.

== Variants ==
Each of the 9mm P.A. cartridge variants are distinguished by a proper color: green, yellow, blue, red, etc.

9mm P.A. ammunitions can be used for different purposes depending on the legislation, these include military training, cinema props, self-defense (rubber bullets can only be used in certain Eastern European countries), dog training, historical re-enactment, holiday or new year celebration (mostly in Turkey, Germany and Italy). Colombia S.A. and other South American countries also allow the use of rubber bullets for self defense.

The use of this ammunition also depends on the 9mm P.A. gun's barrel which can be of three kinds depending on the country's own gun legislation that can be more or less restrictive.

Fully obstructed barrel are called "top firing" (or "top venting") for they have a long hole on the barrel's top while the muzzle is closed. "Front firing" (or "front venting") guns have a semi-obstructed barrel that allows for a flame, smoke or tear gas to be ejected out of the muzzle. According to American federal laws, both "front firing" and "top firing" new guns must be identified by a red plastic tip fixed on the muzzle.

Russia's guns legislation allows civilians self-defence hence local 9mm P.A. guns can have a clear barrel that can fire non-lethal rubber bullets.

== Blank firing ==
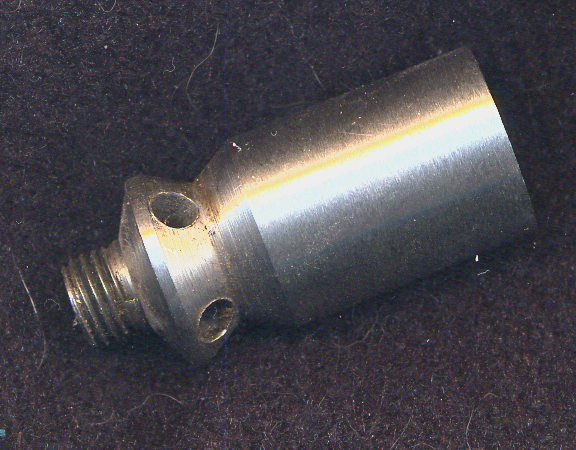
Barrel adaptor to fire 15mm flares in conjunction with 9mm P.A. blank cartridges

These blank cartridges can also be used to fire pyrotechnics (single or multi-shots) or non-lethal "self-gomm" rubber bullets with the proper adaptor attached to the barrel.

=== 9mm P.A. Knall ===
Cal. 9mm P.A. Blank (a.k.a. «9mm P.A.K.») are blank cartridges made for semi-automatic pistols.

GREEN. Standard "Blank" cartridges.
YELLOW. "Flash Defense" blank cartridges producing a longer flame at the end of the barrel.

=== 9mm R./9mm R. NC ===
Semi-automatic 9mm P.A. ammunitions are not compatible with gas pistols 9mm R. (.380) or 9mm R NC designed for blank-firing revolvers.

== Tear gas ==
=== 9mm P.A. CS ===
Cal. 9mm P.A. CS are cartridges loaded with tear gas CS (80 mg).

YELLOW. "CS" cartridges are loaded with 80mg.

=== 9mm P.A. CN ===
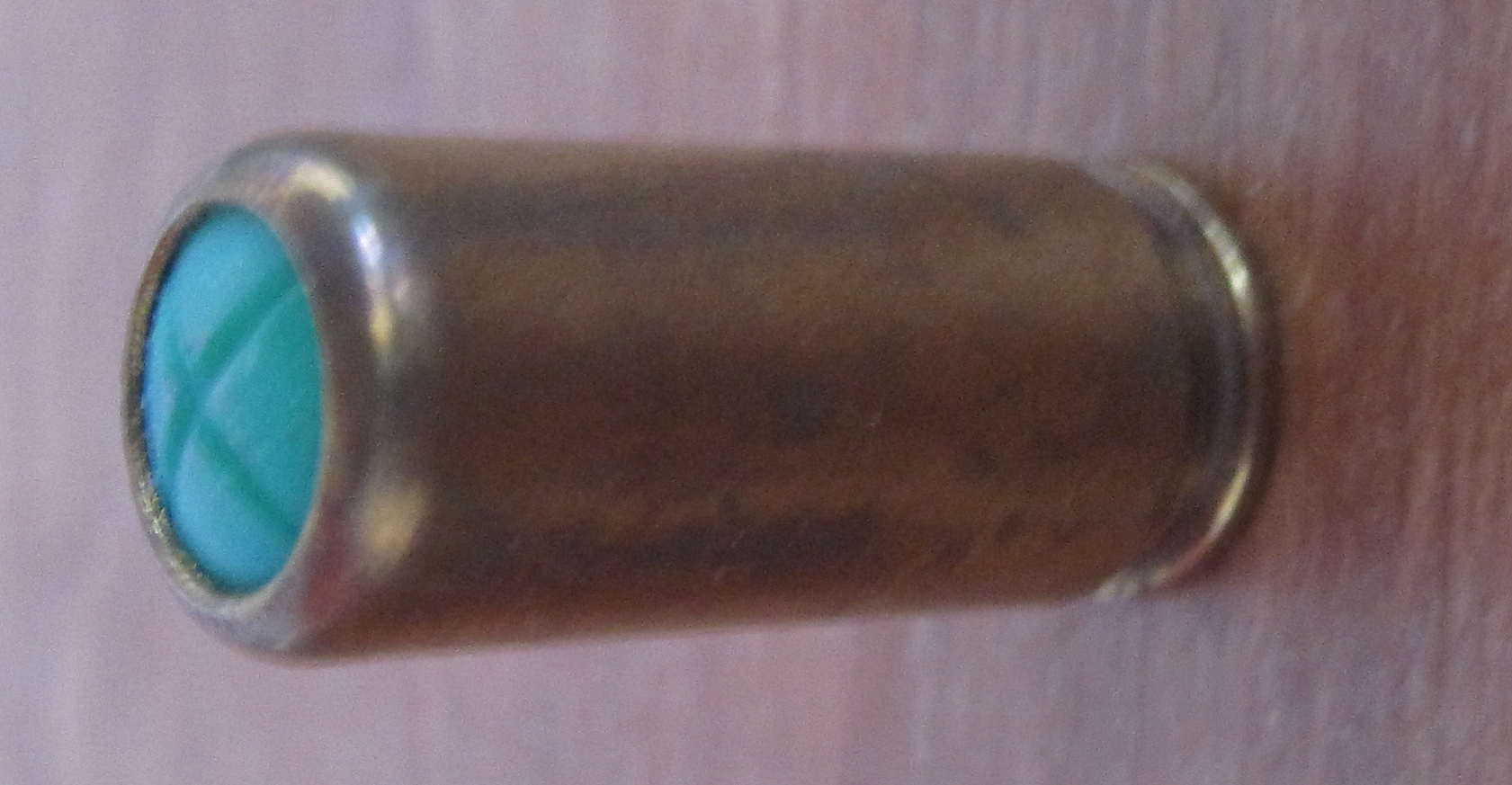
9mm P.A. CN cartridge loaded with tear gas CN (160mg). Note the blue plastic on the cartridge.

Cal. 9mm P.A. CN are cartridges loaded with tear gas CN (160 or 220 mg).

BLUE. "CN" cartridges are loaded with 160mg.
PURPLE. "Supra CN" cartridges are loaded with 220mg.

=== 9mm P.A. PV ===
Cal. 9mm P.A. PV are cartridges loaded with pepper spray (20, 30 or 45 mg) and intended to be used for self-defense against dangerous animals.

BROWN. "Pepper" cartridges are loaded with 20mg.
RED. "Pepper flash" cartridges are loaded with 30mg.
RED. "Extra strong" cartridges are loaded with 45mg.

== Rubber bullets ==
Front-firing 9mm P.A. pistols can shoot 18 mm non-lethal self-gomm rubber bullets through an adapter attached to the barrel's end. Unlike 9mm P.A. rubber bullets, these 18 mm rubber bullets are manually loaded by the muzzle.

=== 9mm P.A. Tehkrim ===
Cal. 9mm P.A. Tehkrim. Russian ammunitions maker Tehkrim manufactures non-lethal rubber bullets (0.68g) chambered in 9mm P.A. This particular ammunition cannot be used in standard 9mm P.A. blank firing pistols sold in Europe and America for they use semi-obstructed (front firing) or fully obstructed (top-firing) barrels.

RED.

=== 9mm P.A. PP9RP ===
Cal. 9mm P.A. PP9RP. Russian ammunition with a rubber bullet (standard, sport or magnum) similar to Tehkrims.

BLACK.

== Notable makers ==
=== 9mm P.A. semi-automatic pistols ===
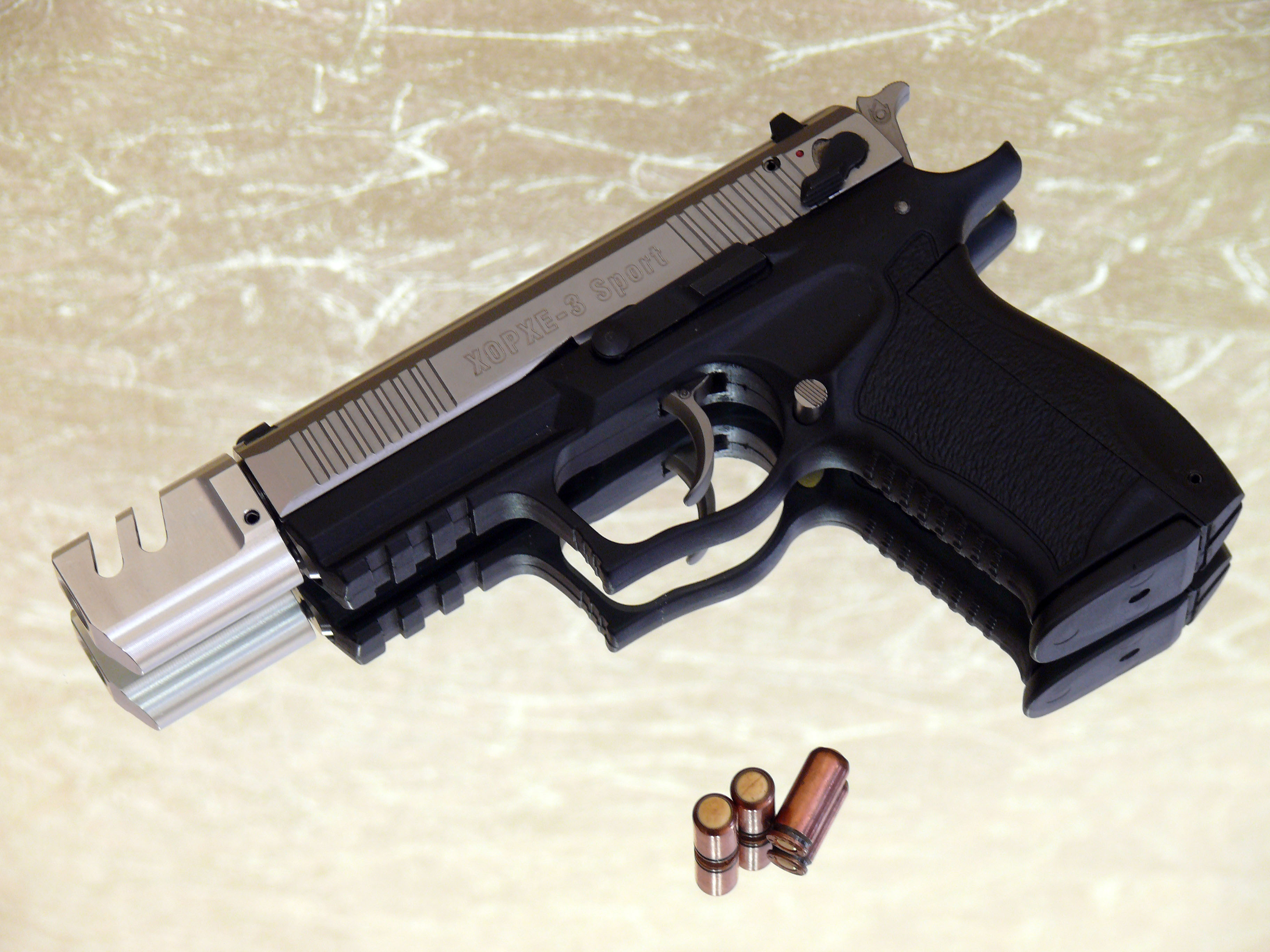
Russian semi-automatic pistol KSAP Horhe-3 Sport chambered in 9mm P.A. with three CS loaded tear gas cartridges. Note the muzzle brake attached to the end of the barrel.

Notable 9mm P.A. pistols include ME, Umarex (Reck), Röhm and Walther from Germany (earlier from West Germany), Kimar (Chiappa Firearms) and Bruni from Italy, Ceonic, EKOL, Retay and Zoraki from Turkey and KSAP from Russia.

These makers can be classified in four distinct groups. Those, like Walther or Röhm, who are gunmakers who manufacture well-known models chambered in 9mm P.A.

A second group includes Umarex who produces models licensed from famous gunmakers including Colt or Smith & Wesson. These guns are copies faithful to the originals in terms of cosmetic and design and they use real names and logos.

The third group is the largest of all four as it encompasses all makers from Italy, Turkey and ME from Germany who are selling unlicensed replicas of famous brands except Ceonic, like the Beretta 92 or the Magnum Desert Eagle. Due to obvious copyright reasons, these models are more or less resembling to the original and they use an alternative name. For these reasons they are cheaper than licensed models.

The last group comprises makers like KSAP who design and produce original guns chambered in 9mm P.A.

=== 9mm P.A. fully automatic pistols ===
Turkish gunmaker Ekol manufactures a full-auto unlicensed replica of the Beretta 92 called the Jackal Dual (215 mm/1150 gr) retrospectively dubbed "Magnum" since it is available in a shorter barrel version called Jackal Dual Compact (185 mm/1050 gr). The Jackal Dual (full-size Magnum or Compact) is a semi-auto & full-auto blank machine pistol using a 15-round or a 25-round magazine.

=== 9mm P.A. fully automatic submachine guns ===
Turkish gunmaker Ekol manufactures an original (yet loosely resembling the Uzi) 9mm P.A. fully automatic submachine gun or machine pistol, the ASI. The ASI is basically a semi-auto & full-auto blank machine pistol with added parts and sold with both a 15-round and a 25-round magazine.

=== 9mm P.A. ammunitions ===
Cal. 9mm P.A. Blank, or 9mm P.A. Knall (in German), or 9mm P.A. Blanc (in French), ammunition notable makers include Geco, GSG, Umarex (Titan Perfecta), Wadie and Walther from Germany (earlier from West Germany), Fiocchi from Italy, Sellier & Bellot from Czech Republic, Pobjeda Sport (Concorde, Victory) from Bosnia and Herzegovina, Meca (Anatolia Fisek), Turac (in V.Sport and Kaiser brands), Özkursan or Y.A.S. (Yavascalar) from Turkey.

Some of these makers, like Pobjeda Sport, use different brands depending on the market and their local distributors. Some makers like Y.A.S. use empty cases manufactured by other ammunitions makers in this particular case it's Umarex and some makers like Turac produce cases by themselves.

Cartridges are available in brass or steel cases depending on the maker or the brand.

== Conversion to live ammunition ==
Modified versions of the 9mm P.A. Knall, adapted to fire lethal projectiles, are occasionally encountered in criminal forensics.

Modification of blank-firing ammunition, associated magazines or firearms is strictly prohibited by law in some countries. Attempting such a conversion is also dangerous for the user since the materials and production methods involved in the making of blank-firing replicas are not the same as those of firearms designed for live ammunition as the replica pistols are plain blowback.

== Gallery ==
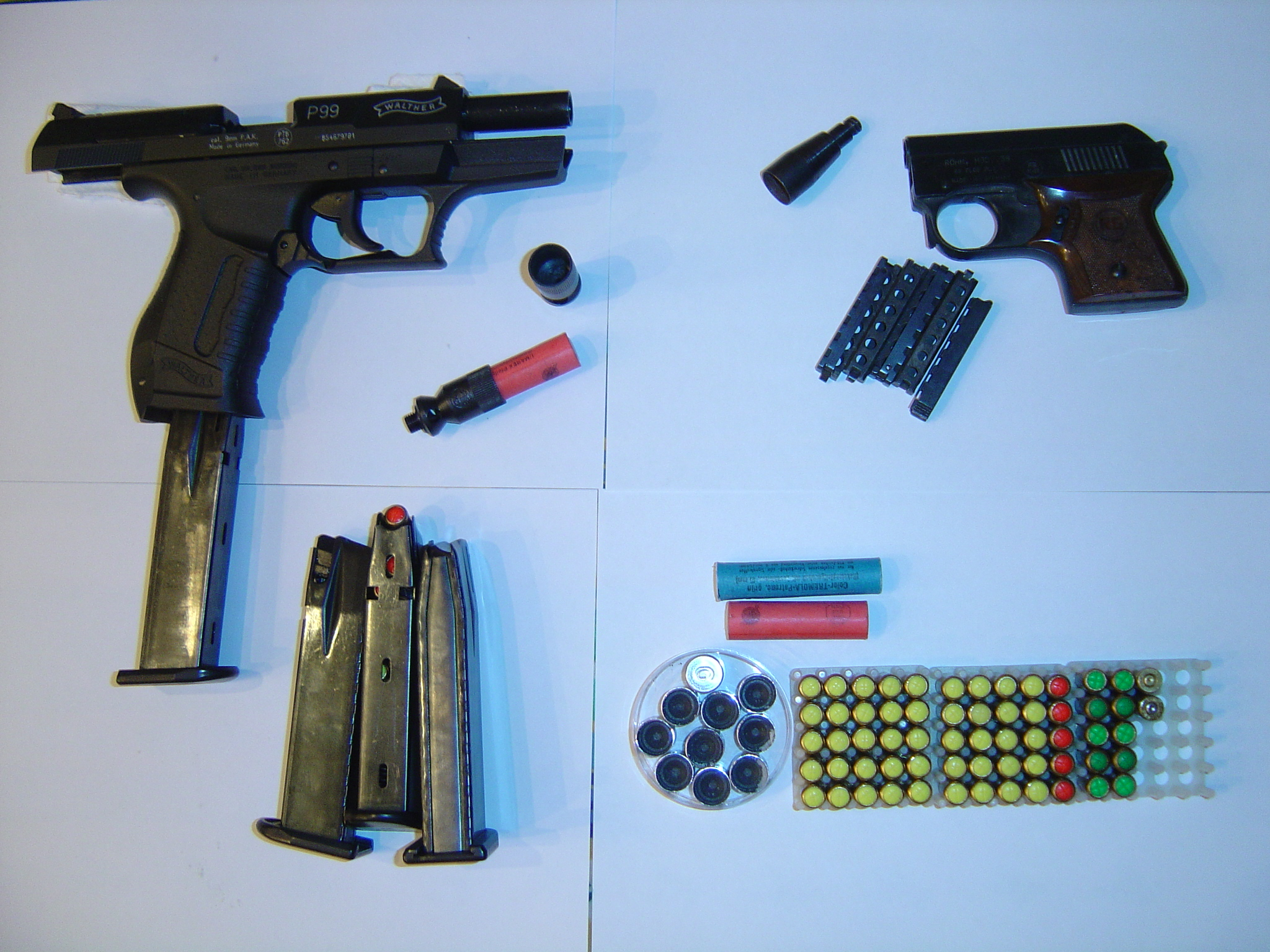
Walther P99 & Röhm RG 3, P99 is chambered in 9mm P.A.

== See also ==
- 9 mm caliber
- Blank (cartridge)
- Gas pistol
