= Gas pistol =

Replica of a real handgun that can fire blanks

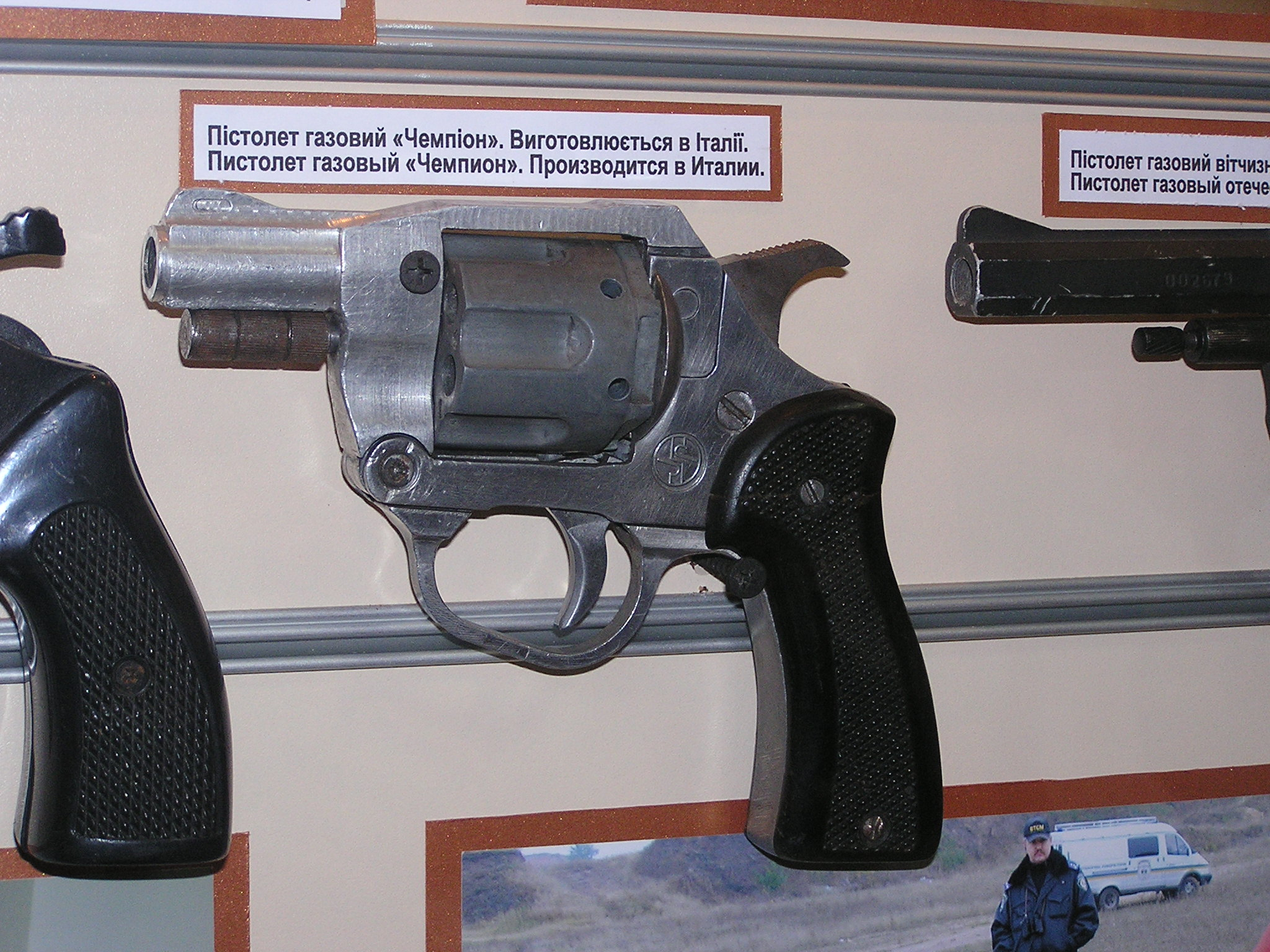
Italian Champion gas revolver

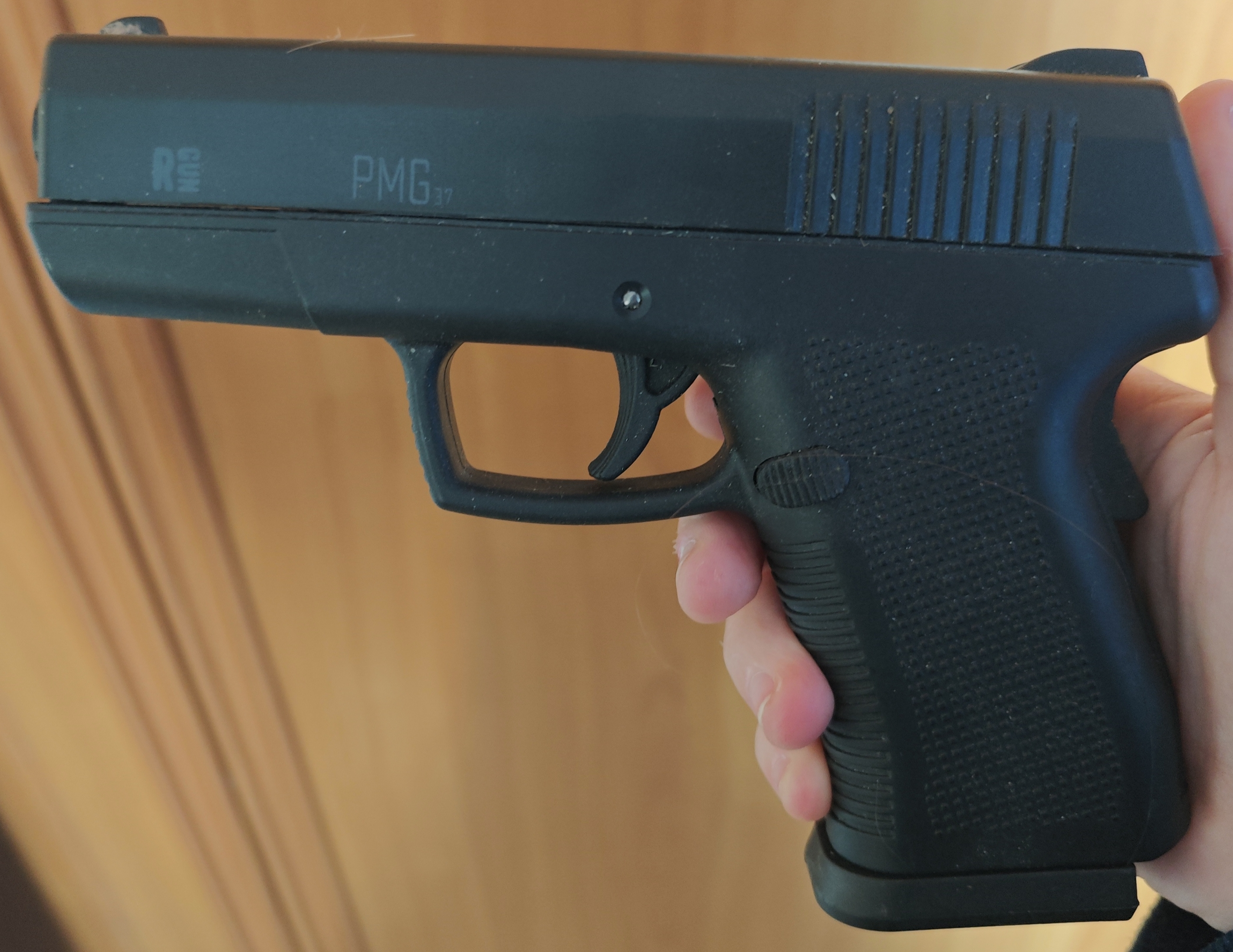
PMG-37 gas gun

A gas pistol is a non-lethal weapon used for self-defense and other purposes. It is typically a close-to-exact replica or conversion of a traditional handgun made to be able to fire blanks or tear gas cartridges. Effective range is up to 4.5 metres depending on caliber.

For legal purposes, various techniques are used during manufacture/conversion to prevent the use of live ammunition, such as using calibers exclusive to gas cartridges, welding obstacles into a non-removable barrel and using malleable metal alloys. Gas pistols are prevalent in European countries with strict gun control laws. Gas pistols are also used in weapons training, and as starting pistols, flare guns, and movie props.

== Calibers ==
Most popular calibers are the 9mm Knall (9x17 mm R K, 9 mm R K, .380 Knall) for revolvers and the 9 mm PAK (9x22 mm) for semi-automatic. Other types include the .315 Knall, 8 mm Knall (8x20 mm), .22 Lang Knall, .45 Short Knall (.45 Knall) and the 6 mm percussion cap, loaded with 20–120 mg of CN gas, CS gas, CR gas (available only in Russia), OC (pepper) agents, or blanks.

== See also ==
- Traumatic pistol
