= Bean bag round =

Less-than-lethal round for shotguns

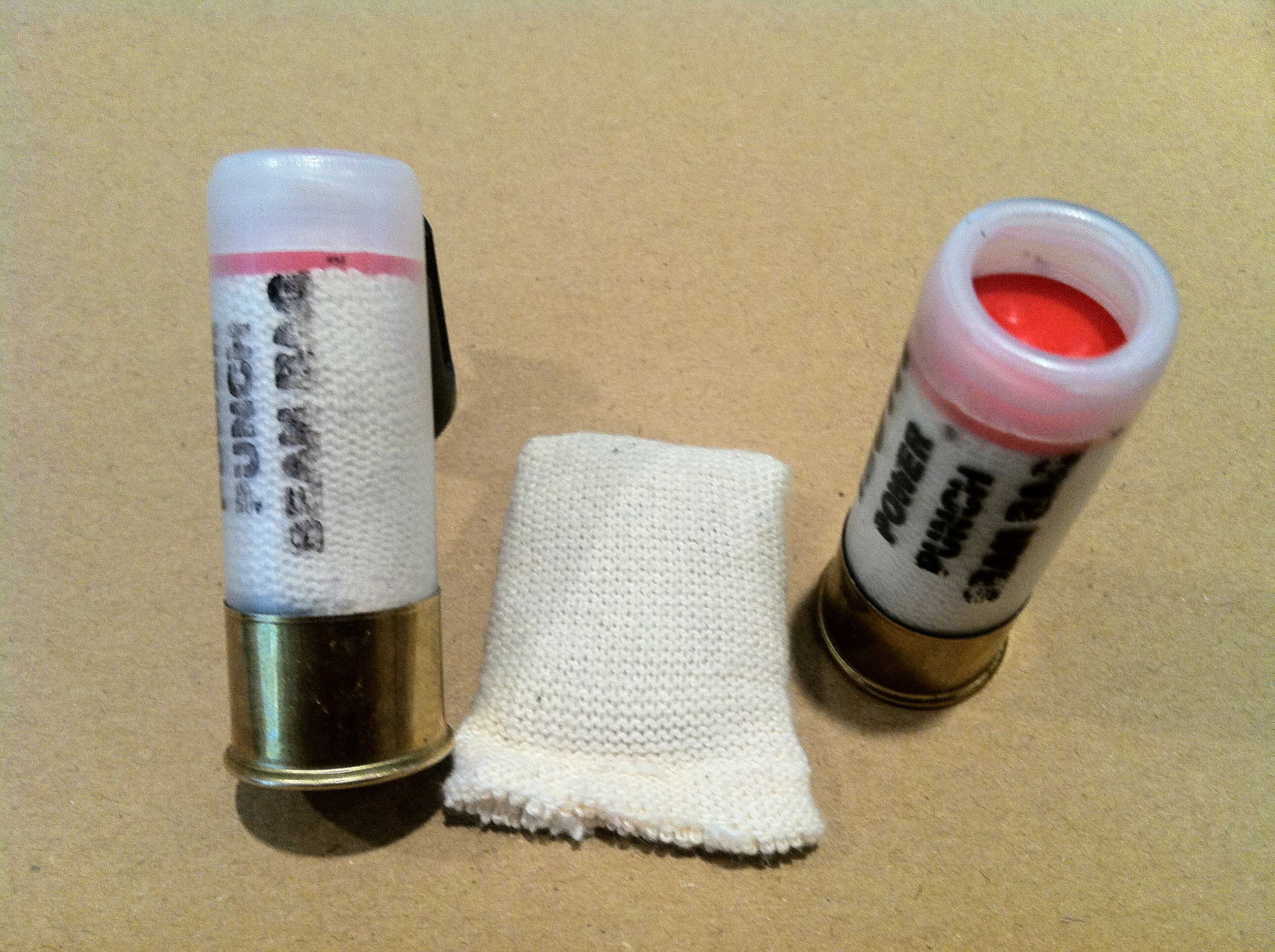
Two views of intact bean bag round and one view of the projectile

A bean bag round, also known by its trademarked name flexible baton round, is a type of baton round, fired from a shotgun, and used for less-lethal apprehension of suspects.

== Description ==
The bean bag round typically consists of a small fabric "pillow" filled with #9 lead shot weighing about 40 grams (1.4 oz). It is fired from a normal 12-gauge shotgun. When fired, the bag is expelled at around 70 to 90 metres per second (230 to 300 ft/s); it spreads out in flight and distributes its impact over about 6 square centimetres (1 sq in) of the target. It is designed to deliver a blow that will cause minimum long-term trauma and no penetration but will result in a muscle spasm or other reaction to briefly render a violent suspect immobile. It still can cause serious injury and death. The shotgun round is inaccurate over about 6 metres (20 ft) and has a maximum range of around 20 metres (70 ft). Changes to the bean bag round since its inception in the early 1970s have included a velocity reduction from 120 to 90 meters per second (400 to 300 ft/s) as well as a shift from a square shape to a more rounded sock-shaped projectile.

Shotguns dedicated to being used for bean bag rounds are often visibly modified with either yellow or green markings, or bright orange stocks and stops, to reduce the possibility that a user might inadvertently load lethal ammunition into the weapon.

== Use ==
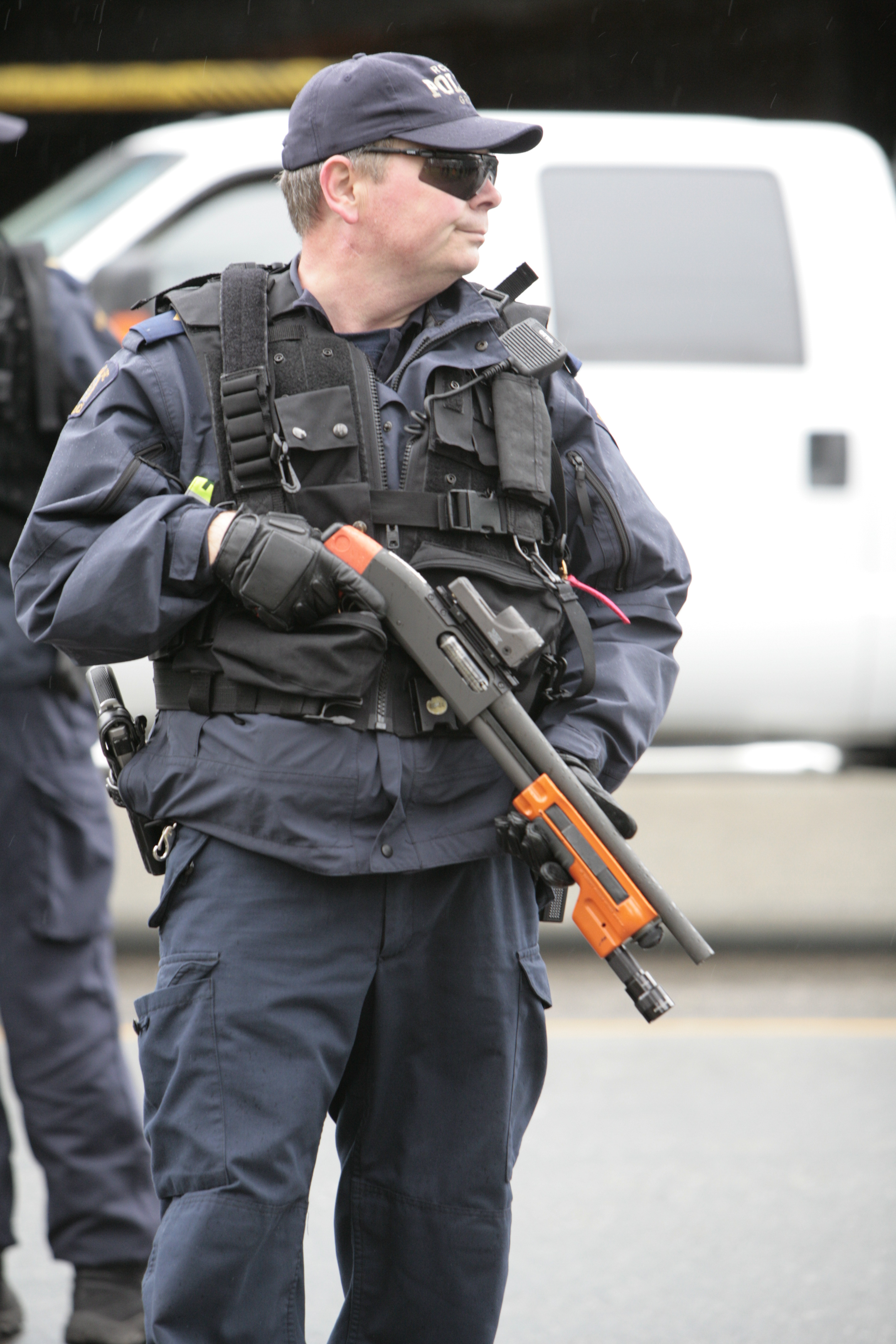
A Canadian Mounted Police officer in 2010 armed with a shotgun outfitted to fire beanbag rounds

Bean bag rounds are used when a person is a danger to themselves or others but is not a direct threat in such a manner that deadly force would be appropriate – typically a suicidal individual with a bladed weapon. The round is intended to disable the person without killing them.

== Dangers ==
A bean bag round can severely injure or kill in a wide variety of ways. They have caused around one death a year since their introduction in the US. A round can hit the chest, break the ribs and send the broken ribs into the heart. A shot to the head can break the nose, crush the larynx or break the neck or skull of the subject. This is why many officers are taught to aim for the extremities when using a bean bag round. A strike in the abdominal area can cause internal bleeding or strike the celiac plexus which can disrupt breathing or heartbeat, but such a hit is generally safer than most other areas as well as presenting a larger target than an extremity. Fatalities are occasionally the result of mistaking other shotgun rounds for bean bags.

- In 2006, during anti-corruption protests in Budapest, Hungary, protestors were shot by beanbag rounds to the head. At least 3 of them were permanently blinded. One of the victims committed suicide in 2013 due to psychological complications arising from his blindness. In addition, many people suffered minor injuries (nose and finger fractures, hemorrhagic bruises). Furthermore, a few victims suffered from long-term psychological trauma due to the shock.
- In 2013, in Park Forest, Illinois, an autopsy showed that a 95-year-old man had died from hemoperitoneum as a result of being shot by police with a bean bag gun.
- 11 August 2019, during the Hong Kong anti-extradition bill protests, a female First Aider claimed to have been hit by a bean bag round, resulting in rupture of one of her eyeballs.
- On 23 November 2019, a bean bag round fired by the Colombian riot police hit student Dilan Cruz in the head, killing him.
- 31 May 2020, 20-year-old Justin Howell was shot in the head by the Austin PD while at a protest, suffering a skull fracture leading to seizure and brain trauma. The next day, 1 June 2020, 16-year-old Brad Levi Ayala also suffered a skull fracture after being shot in the head with a beanbag round by the Austin PD.
- 22 August 2022, Chris Amyotte, 42, an Ojibwe man from Manitoba, died after being hit by a beanbag round fired at him by an officer of the Vancouver Police Department in Vancouver, British Columbia, Canada.
- 14 September 2023, Krista Kach, 47, an Australian woman died after being hit by a beanbag round fired at her by an officer of New South Wales Police in Stockton, NSW. She was taken to hospital but her condition deteriorated and she later died. An interim coroner's report determined that the round had penetrated her chest, hitting her heart.
- 24 September 2023, Rafael dos Santos Tercilio Garcia, 32, a deaf fan of São Paulo Football Club, died of traumatic brain injury just outside Morumbi Stadium after being hit in the head by a beanbag round fired during a riot control operation by the Military Police of São Paulo State directed at São Paulo FC fans celebrating victory in 2023 Brazil Cup. Besides a bean bag device attached to Rafael's head, forensic experts found his cap perforated.

== See also ==
- Non-lethal weapon
- Shooting of Victoria Snelgrove
- Wooden bullet
