= Wooden bullet =

Less-lethal projectile

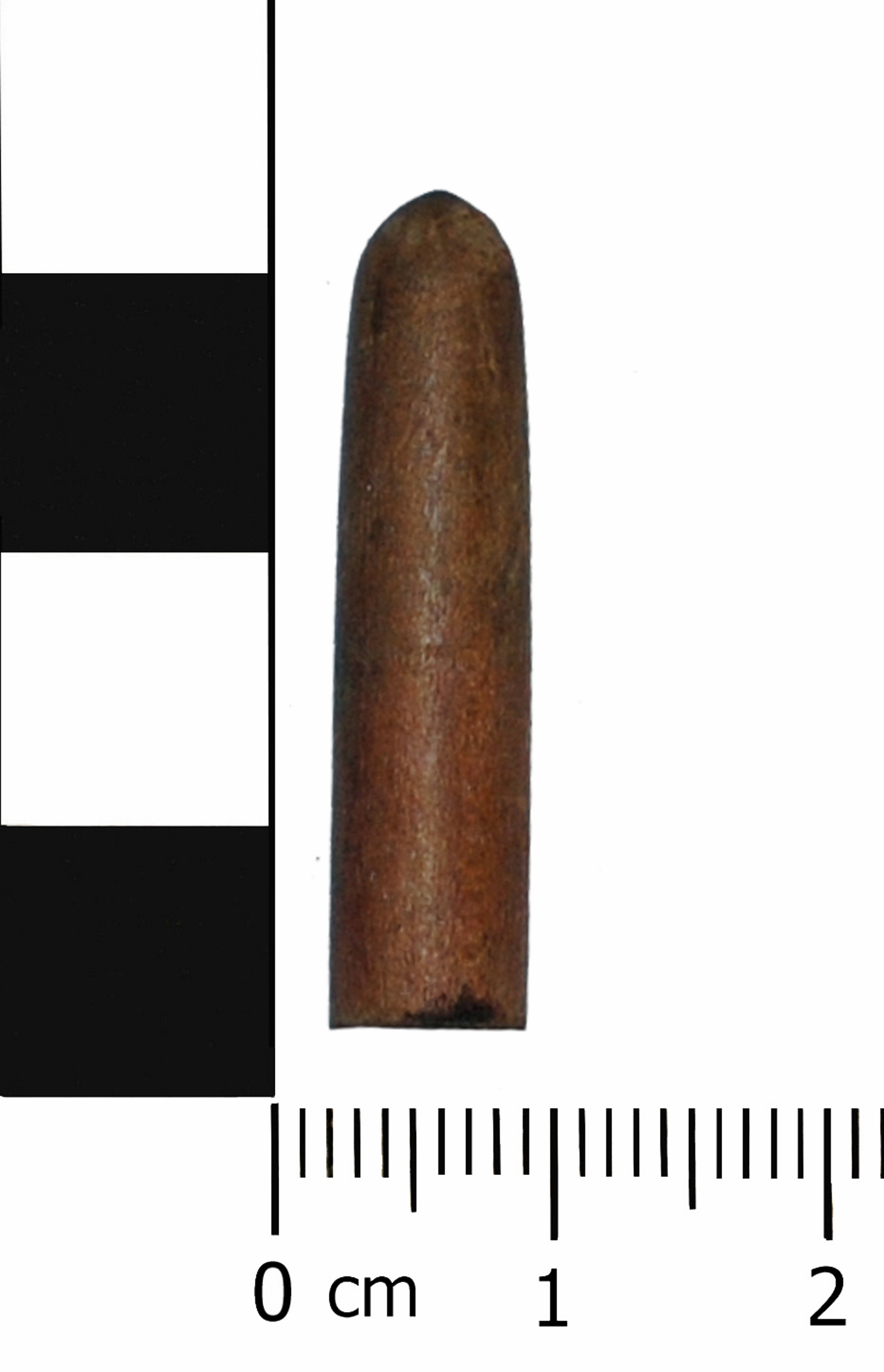
- A wooden bullet shaped object. It is smooth all over and brown in colour.
- Type: Non-lethal weapon

Wooden bullets are wooden projectiles designed to be fired from a gun. They are intended to be used as less lethal weapons for crowd control by enforcing pain compliance at a distance. They have been known to raise large welts or bruises on their targets.

== History of use ==
During the Second World War, some German troops were equipped with wooden bullets, while British troops were trained with wooden bullets to avoid the cost of metal bullets.

German troops in the Second World War used wooden bullets as rifle grenades, the rounds being hollow and made of softwood, designed to shatter on impact and were actually blanks, not real shots. Rumors that the tips were poisoned to cause infection were false, and so were the rumors that the tips were colored differently based on what poison was in the bullet. In reality, it was to differentiate which grenade was to be launched from that blank.

Wooden bullets were also used by British troops in Hong Kong. During a 2014 protest in Missouri following the shooting of Michael Brown, the police fired wooden bullets at protesters. During the 1999 WTO anti-globalization movement in Seattle, the police shot wooden bullets at protesters.

A team of research engineers in Wisconsin used 12-foot-long (3.7 m), 15-pound (6.8 kg), 2-by-4 pine bullets propelled at 100 miles per hour (45 m/s) by an air cannon to test the resistance of tornado shelters made of wood.

== See also ==
- Bean bag round
- Plastic bullet
- Rubber bullet
