= Horhe =

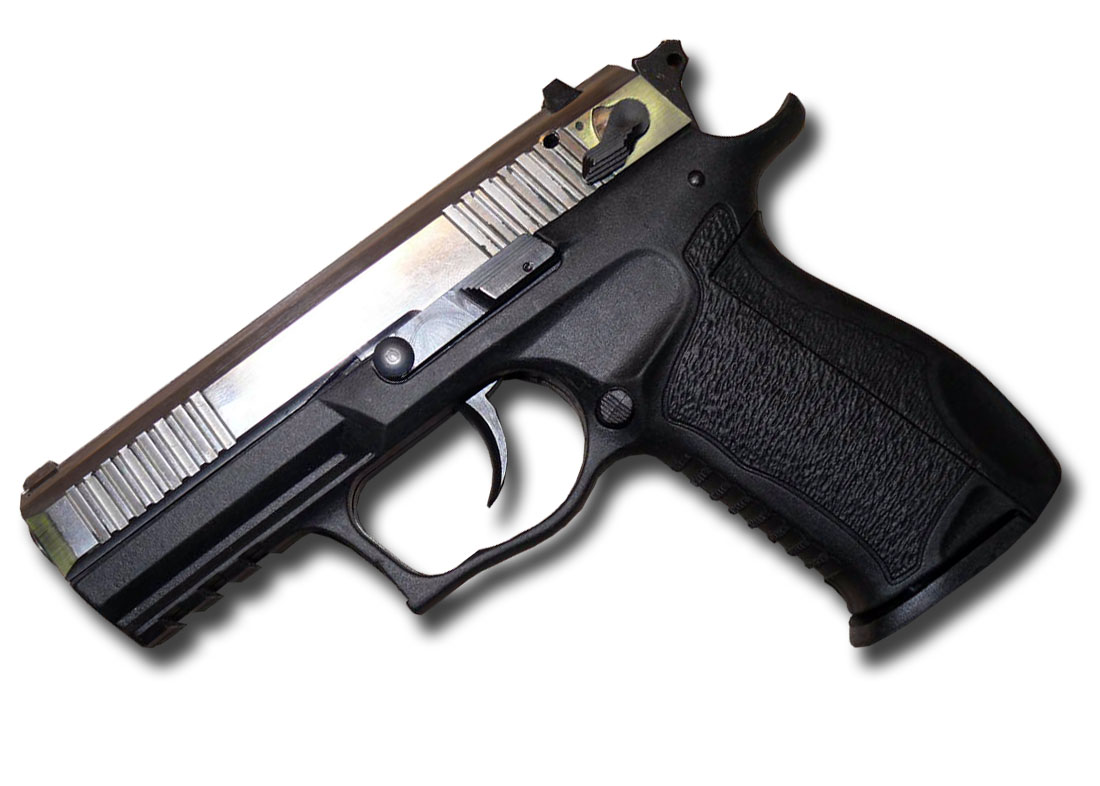
- Type: Non-lethal pistol
- Place of origin: Russia

Production history
- Manufacturer: KSAP
- Produced: since 2006

Specifications
- Mass: 0.83 kg (without cartridges)
- Length: 180 mm (7.1 in)
- Width: 32
- Height: 131
- Cartridge: 9 mm P.A.
- Caliber: 9.0 mm
- Action: double-action SA/DA Blowback
- Rate of fire: 40
- Muzzle velocity: 300 m/s (980 ft/s)
- Effective firing range: 5–7 m (16–23 ft)
- Feed system: 10/14-round detachable box magazine
- Sights: open fixed

The Horhe (Russian: Хорхе) is a family of Russian non-lethal pistols, based on Ukrainian Fort 12 and Fort 17 pistols.

== History ==
Horhe are produced since 2006 by joint-stock company Klimovsk Specialized Ammunition Plant.

== Design ==
The main parts of the gun are made from steel and hardened in a vacuum.

Some guns are manufactured wholly or partially from stainless steel; the barrel is always made from stainless steel.

The pistol is equipped with a self-cocking trigger hammer type double-acting SA/DA.

The design provides slide catch holding the bolt after firing the last bullet in the rearward position.

Blowback action (no barrel grip with a bolt, locking the barrel reached the mass closure and force the return spring).

Commercially available ammunition include blanks and cartridges loaded with tear gas or rubber bullets.

=== Accessories ===
On pistols with polymer frame can be installed laser sight and gun-mounted flashlight.

== Variants ==
English	Russian	Description	References
Horhe	Хорхе	Civilian model with metal frame	
Horhe-1	Хорхе-1	Civilian model with a polymer frame	
Horhe-S	Хорхе-С	"Service model" for private security guards with metal frame	
Horhe-1S	Хорхе-1С	"Service model" for private security guards with polymer frame	
Horhe-2	Хорхе-2	New civilian model	
Horhe-3	Хорхе-3	New civilian model with updated version of the bolt and the polymer frame made from durable plastic	
Horhe-3S	Хорхе-3 Спорт	An updated version of the bolt and the polymer frame, with a barrel without obstacles, made from durable plastic with the addition of fiberglass	

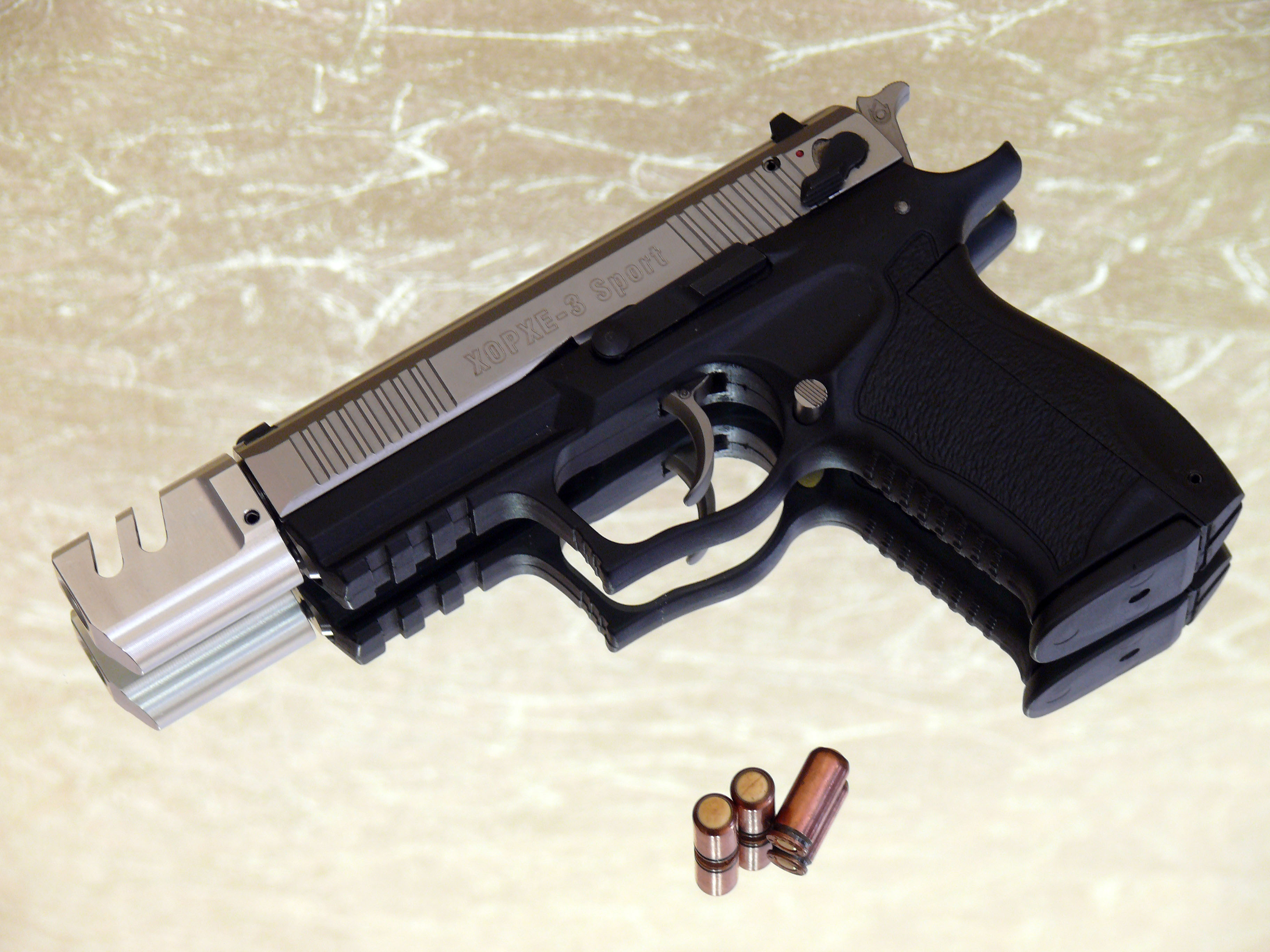
Horhe-3S - sport version of pistol

== Legal status ==
- Russia - The use of non-lethal weapons in Russia is permitted to civil population, and it is also used by private security.
- Kazakhstan - The use of non-lethal weapons is permitted to civil population, and it is also used by private security guards
