= Hrushivka =

Hrushivka (Ukrainian: Грушівка) may refer to any of the following places in Ukraine:

Chernihiv Oblast
- Hrushivka, Chernihiv Oblast

Crimea
- Hrushivka, Crimea

Dnipropetrovsk Oblast
- Hrushivka, Dnipro Raion
- Hrushivka, Kamianske Raion
- Hrushivka, Kryvyi Rih Raion

Kharkiv Oblast
- Hrushivka, Kharkiv Oblast

Rivne Oblast
- Hrushivka, Rivne Raion
- Hrushivka, Sarny Raion

Zaporizhzhia Oblast
- Hrushivka, Polohy Raion
- Hrushivka, Zaporizhzhia Raion

== See also ==
- Grushevka (disambiguation)
