= Hryfon (special unit) =

Special police unit of Ukraine

Special Unit of the Judicial Police "Hryfon"
- Спеціальний підрозділ судової міліції МВС України «Грифон»
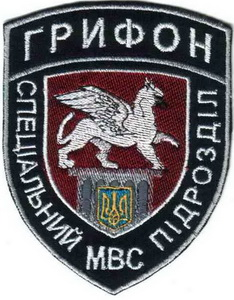
- Active: 2003–2015
- Disbanded: 2015
- Country: Ukraine
- Role: Internal security Law enforcement
- Size: 2,000
- Part of: Ministry of Internal Affairs of Ukraine
- Garrison/HQ: Kyiv
- Mascot: Griffin
- Engagements: Euromaidan; Russo-Ukrainian War; War in Donbas

Hryfon (Ukrainian: Грифон) was a special unit of the judicial police of the Ministry of Internal Affairs of Ukraine, whose task was to ensure the safety of court employees, persons participating in criminal proceedings, their family members and close relatives, as well as the protection of judicial institutions. In order to fulfill their functions, Hryfon units had the right to conduct operational measures to identify potential threats to judges and trial participants, persons who were under guard.

After the liquidation of the special unit, its functions were transferred to the Court Security Service.

== History ==
On 23 July 1997, in compliance with the Resolution of the Cabinet of Ministers of Ukraine, the Minister of Internal Affairs of Ukraine issued an order "On the creation of special police units to ensure the safety of court employees, law enforcement agencies, persons participating in criminal proceedings, their family members and close relatives."

Subsequently, on 19 November 2003, the Regulation "On the special unit of the judicial police "Hryfon" was approved.

"A very important element - I want to thank the Ministry of Justice for supporting this idea - we transfer the judicial militia, which currently exists, to the judicial administration."

This was stated by Eka Zguladze, the first deputy head of the Ministry of Internal Affairs of Ukraine on 4 April 2015, at a meeting of the Cabinet of Ministers of Ukraine, talking about the functional changes envisaged by the package of draft laws on reforming internal affairs bodies.

== Organization ==
By 2004, special unit "Hryfon" (numbering from a company to a battalion) were established in every region of Ukraine.

=== Operations ===
Employees of the Hryfon special unit were involved in ensuring public order during mass events:

- In September 2010, Hryfon employees participated in the protection of the "Jewish town" in Uman.
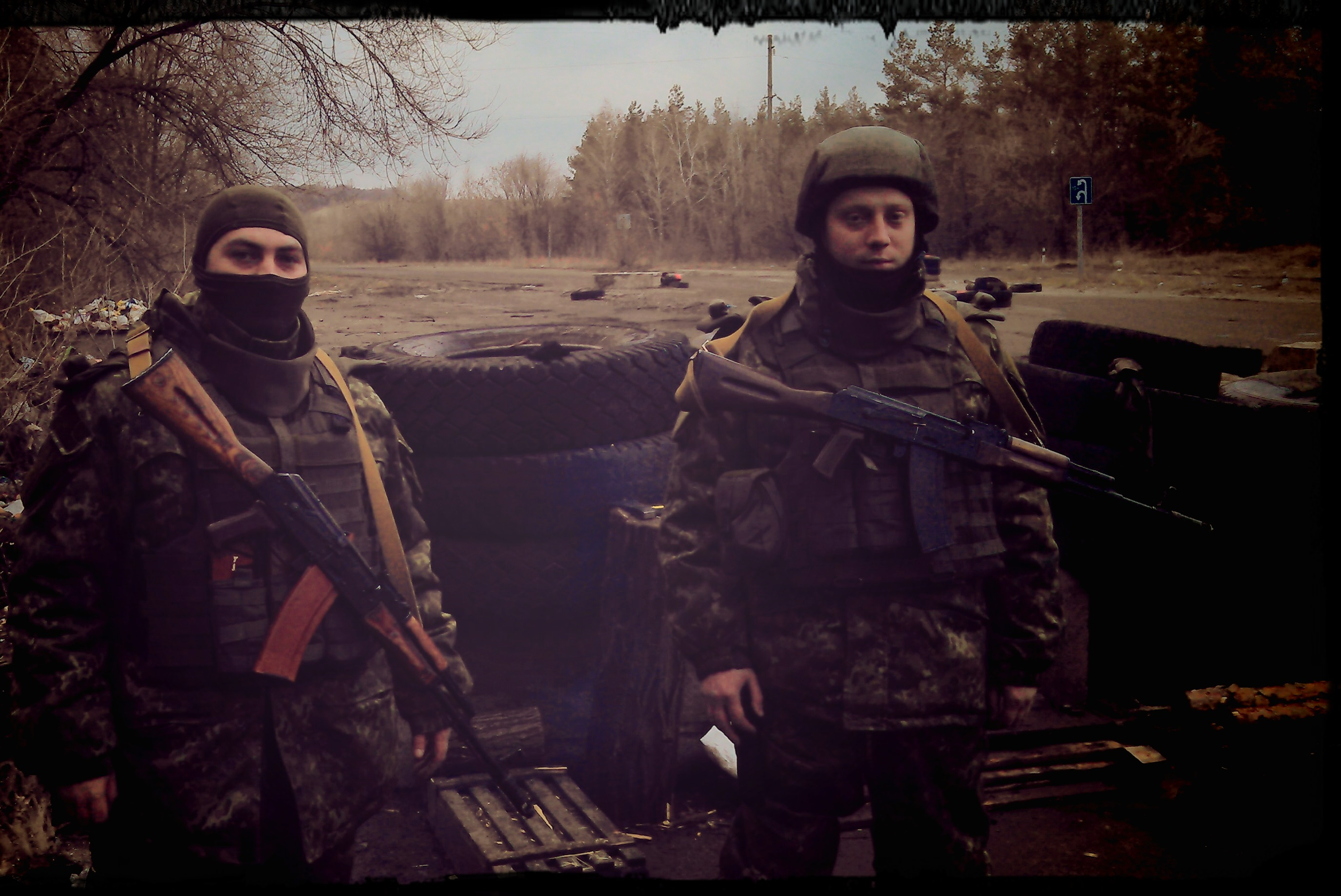
  ATO - Winter 2014, Shchastya
  On 22 June 2011, on the 70th anniversary of the beginning of the Great Patriotic War, about 100 employees of Hryfon ensured law and order in Lviv.
- In April 2012, Hryfon employees took part in maintaining public order during football competitions in Donetsk.

On 17 April 2012, during a clash in the village of Hrushivka of the Kupiansk Raion and the village of Starovirivka of the Shevchenkove Raion of the Kharkiv Oblast, employees of Hryfon provided protection to employees of the prosecutor's office.

In January 2014, during the Euromaidan, special forces fighters took part in maintaining public order in the regions where the units were deployed.

- On 24 January 2014, in Lviv, about 200 Euromaidan activists blocked a bus with employees of the Hryfon special unit in the building of the regional psychiatric hospital in order to prevent them from leaving for Kyiv, punctured the tires of the bus and forced the special forces to throw shields.
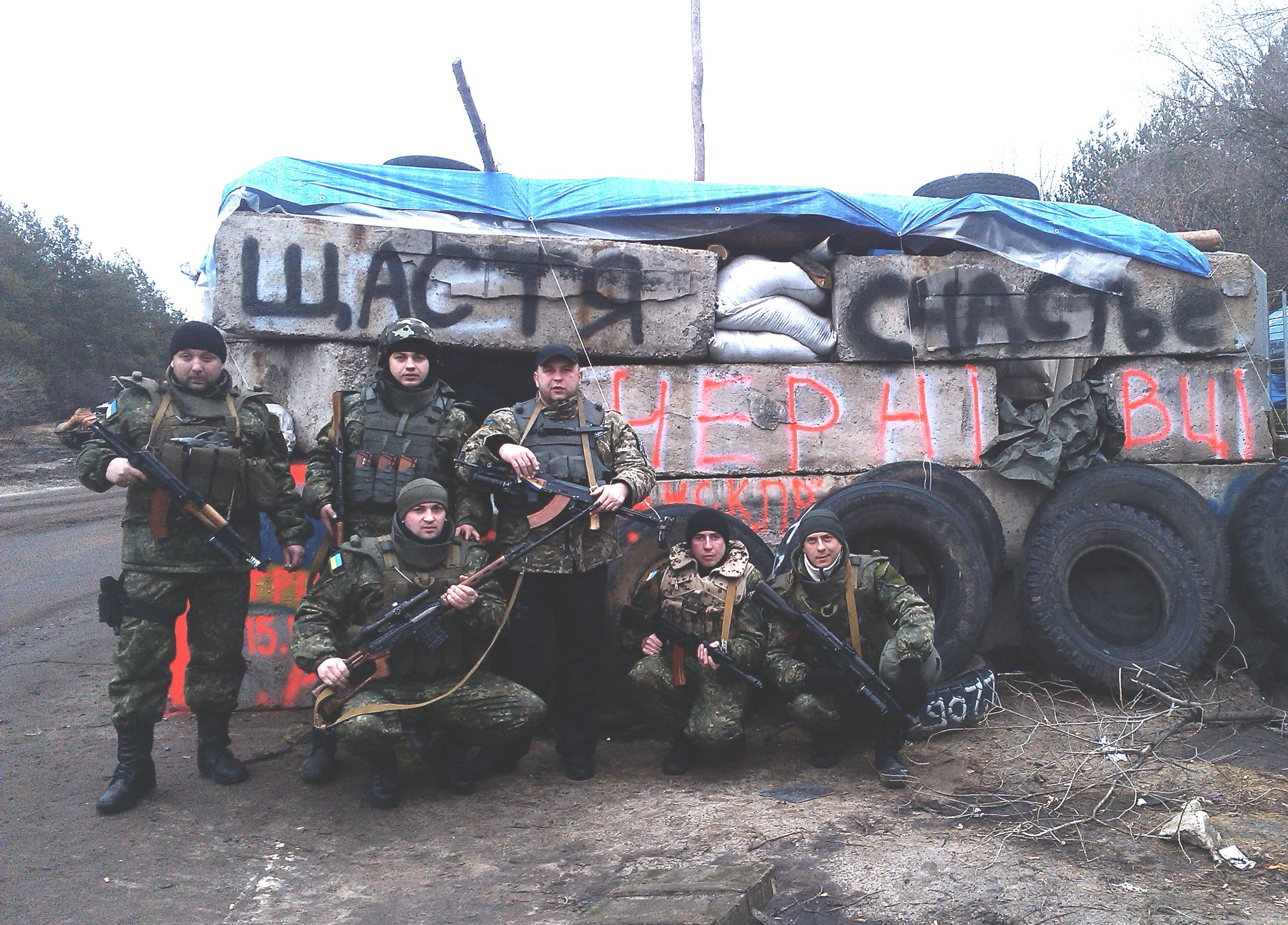
  Roadblock in the city of Shchastya, Luhansk Oblast
- On 28 January 2014, Mykola Kovbasa, an employee of the Lviv Hryfon submitted a report on his dismissal, expressing his disagreement with the methods of dispersal of the Euromaidan.

After the events of Euromaidan, employees of Hryfon took part in the ATO in the Donbas as part of consolidated police units of the regional departments of the Ministry of Internal Affairs during 2014-2015.

On 18 February 2015, a lieutenant of the Hryfon, Oleksandr Oleksandrovych Kamenyuk, was killed near Debaltseve. On 6 August 2015, Ivan Igorovych Sydor died of a gunshot wound.

== Mandate ==
The main tasks of the special unit were to maintain order in the court, to stop acts of disrespect for the court, to protect the court premises, to perform functions related to the state protection of judges and court employees, to ensure the safety of the participants in the court process, to ensure the protection of the premises and territories of forensic examination institutions, as well as the regime of detention of persons, who are in custody and sent for forensic psychiatric examination, participation in the witness protection program.

The forces of the operational support group carried out operational and search activities with the aim of obtaining operational and other information about the existence of a threat to the life, health, housing and property of the specified persons; exchange of information with interested bodies and units of internal affairs on matters of ensuring the security of persons in respect of whom personal security measures are being implemented.

== Equipment ==
The special training of a special unit employee took place at the Kyiv School of Vocational Training for Police Officers and takes five months, another 30–45 days are spent on internship. The special unit has vehicles (cars and minibuses) at its disposal. The special unit is armed with Makarov and Fort-12 pistols, AKS-74U and AKMS assault rifles.

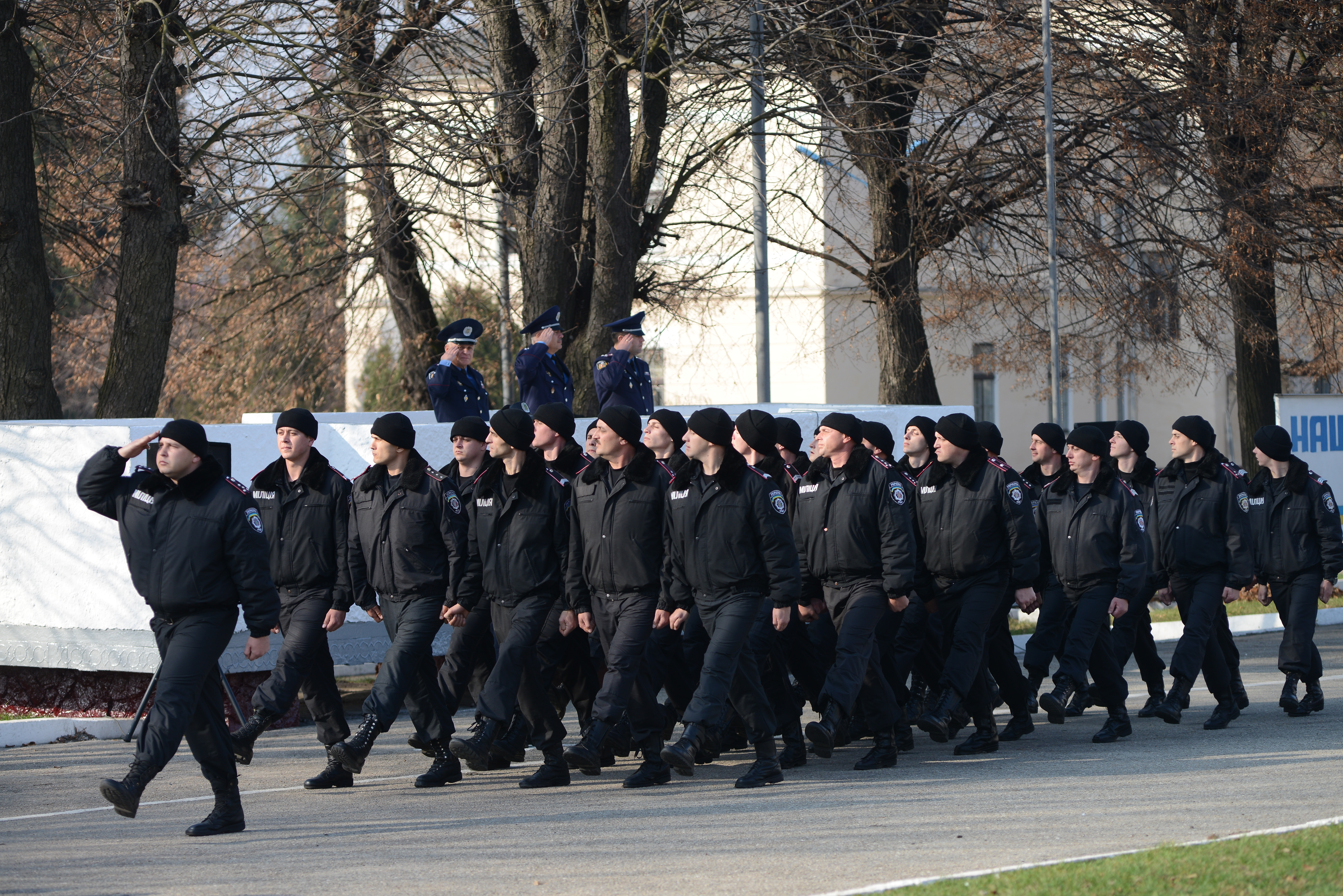
Military inspection of the SRSM HRYFON, Chernivtsi, November 2013

The personnel of the special unit are equipped with black uniforms.

A certain amount of equipment, items of equipment and equipment was received in the form of sponsorship:

- On 29 July 2014, the Hryfon of Chernivtsi Oblast received uniforms and equipment in the amount of 15,000 hryvnias in the form of charitable assistance, to provide for employees who were deployed in the ATO zone.
- On August 5, 2014, the Hryfon of Kirovohrad Oblast received two radio stations, one rangefinder, and one night vision device from entrepreneurs of the region, and one electric generator.
- On 31 August 2014, the Hryfon of the Ivano-Frankivsk Oblast Police Department received several first-aid kits from the National Union of Artists of Ukraine.
- On 10 September 2014, the Hryfon of Cherkasy Oblast received two bulletproof vests of the V class of protection.

== See also ==
- Rapid Operational Response Unit
- Berkut
