= Verbove =

Verbove (Ukrainian: Вербове) is the name of several settlements in Ukraine:

- Verbove, Zakarpattia Oblast
- Verbove, Zaporizhzhia Raion, Zaporizhzhia Oblast
- Verbove, Polohy Raion, Zaporizhzhia Oblast
