= Grushevka =

Grushevka (Russian: Грушевка) may refer to the following places:

== Belarus ==
- Grushevska, Brest
- Grushevska, Dobrush
- Grushevka, Minsk
  - Grushevka (Minsk Metro)
- Grushevka, Narowlya

== Russia ==
- Grushevka, Belgorod Oblast
- Grushevka, Kaliningrad Oblast
- Grushevka, Novosibirsk Oblast
- Grushevka, Tambov Oblast

=== Rostov Oblast ===
- Grushevka, Belokalitvinsky District
- Grushevka, Zimovnikovsky District

== Ukraine ==
- Grushevka, Crimea
- Grushevka, Kharkiv Oblast

== See also ==
- Hrushivka (disambiguation)
