= Kholodivka, Crimea =

Kholodivka Холодівка
- Village
- Location of Kholodivka in Crimea
- Coordinates: 45°03′02″N 34°59′36″E
- Republic: Crimea
- Municipality: Sudak Municipality
- First mentioned: 1784
- Elevation: 246 m (807 ft)

Population (2014)
  - Total: 696
- Time zone: UTC+4 (MSK)
- Postal code: 98021
- Area code: +380 6566
- Website: http://rada.gov.ua/

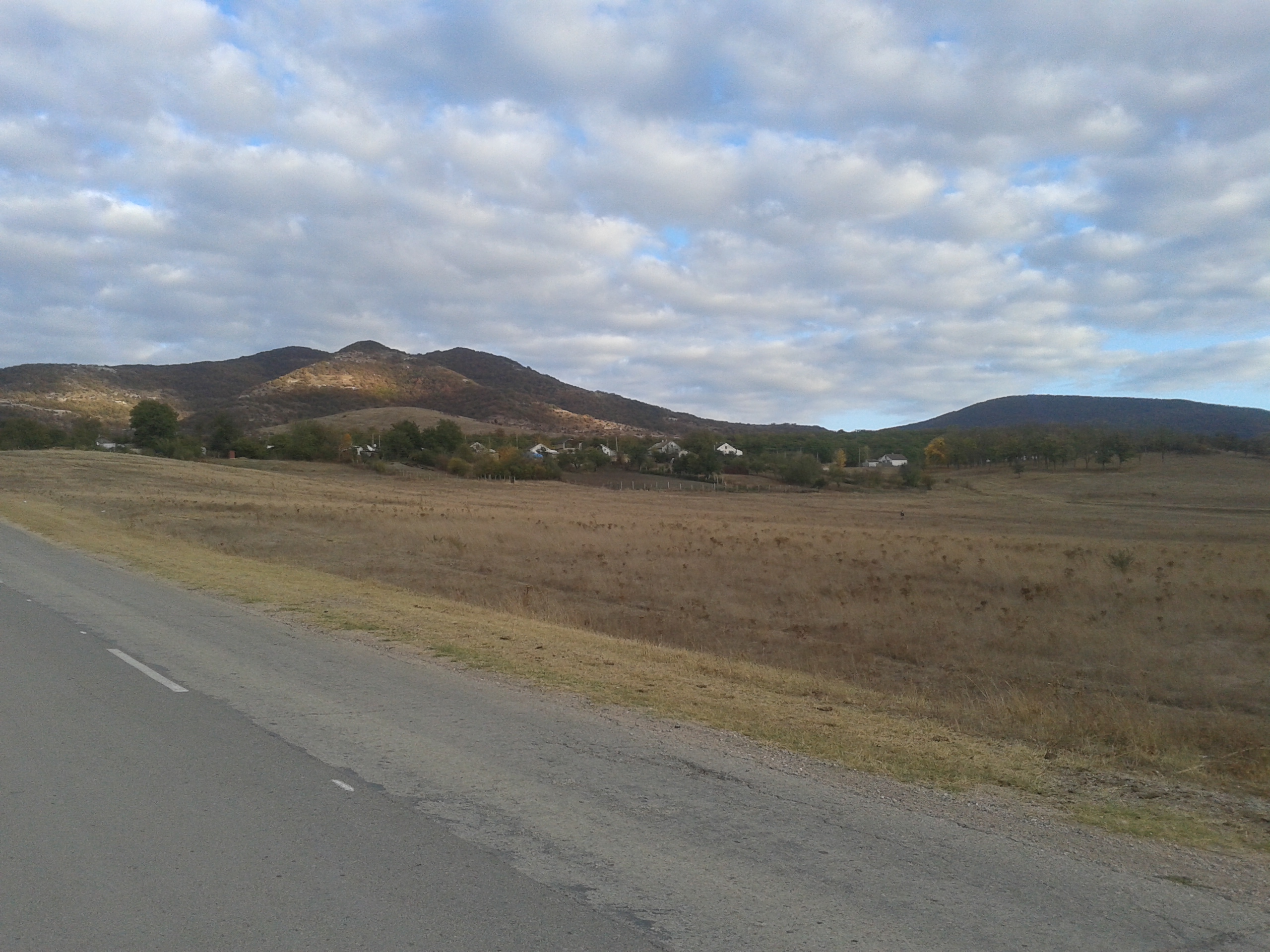
Village of Holodovka, Urban District Sudak Republic of Crimea

Kholodivka or Kholodovka (Ukrainian: Холодівка; Russian: Холодовка) is a village in the Sudak Municipality of the Crimea, a territory recognized by a majority of countries as part of Ukraine and annexed by Russia as the Republic of Crimea.

Previously, the settlement was known as the Osmanchyk village (Crimean Tatar: Osmançıq). Following the forced deportation of the Crimean Tatars in 1944, the Presidium of the Supreme Soviet of the Russian SFSR published a decree on May 18, 1948, renaming the settlement along with many others throughout Crimea from their native Crimean Tatar names to their current variants.

Kholodivka is located on Crimea's southern shore at an elevation of 246 m (807 ft). Its population was 640 in the 2001 Ukrainian census. Current population: 696 (2014 Census).
