= Myndalne =

Myndalne Миндальне
- Village
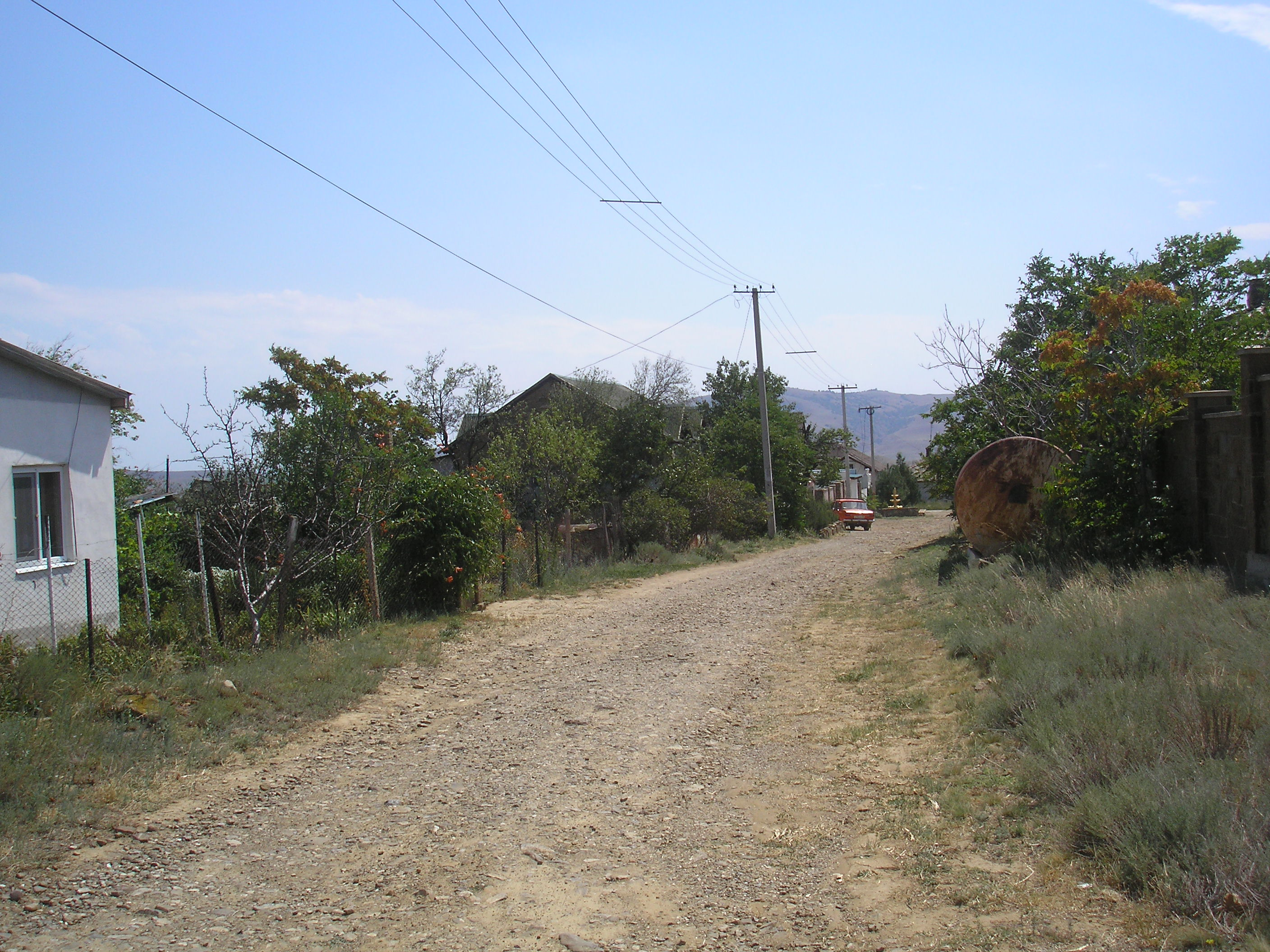

- Location of Myndalne in Crimea Myndalne (Ukraine)
- Coordinates: 44°51′35″N 35°02′55″E
- Republic: Crimea
- Municipality: Sudak Municipality
- Village status: May 21, 2008
- Elevation: 134 m (440 ft)

Population (2014)
  - Total: 143
- Time zone: UTC+4 (MSK)
- Postal code: 98025
- Area code: +380 6566
- Website: http://rada.gov.ua/

Myndalne or Mindalnoye (Ukrainian: Миндальне; Russian: Миндальное) is a village in the Sudak Municipality of the Crimea, a territory recognized by a majority of countries as part of Ukraine and annexed by Russia as the Republic of Crimea.

Previously, the settlement was known as the Arka-Deresi village (Crimean Tatar: Arqa Deresi). Following the forced deportation of the Crimean Tatars in 1944, the Presidium of the Supreme Soviet of the Russian SFSR published a decree on May 18, 1948 renaming the settlement along with many others throughout Crimea from their native Crimean Tatar names to their current variants.

Myndalne is located on Crimea's southern shore at an elevation of 134 metres (440 ft). Its population was 6 in the 2001 Ukrainian census. Current population: 143 (2014 Census).
