= Perevalivka =

Village in Crimea

Perevalivka Перевалівка
- Village
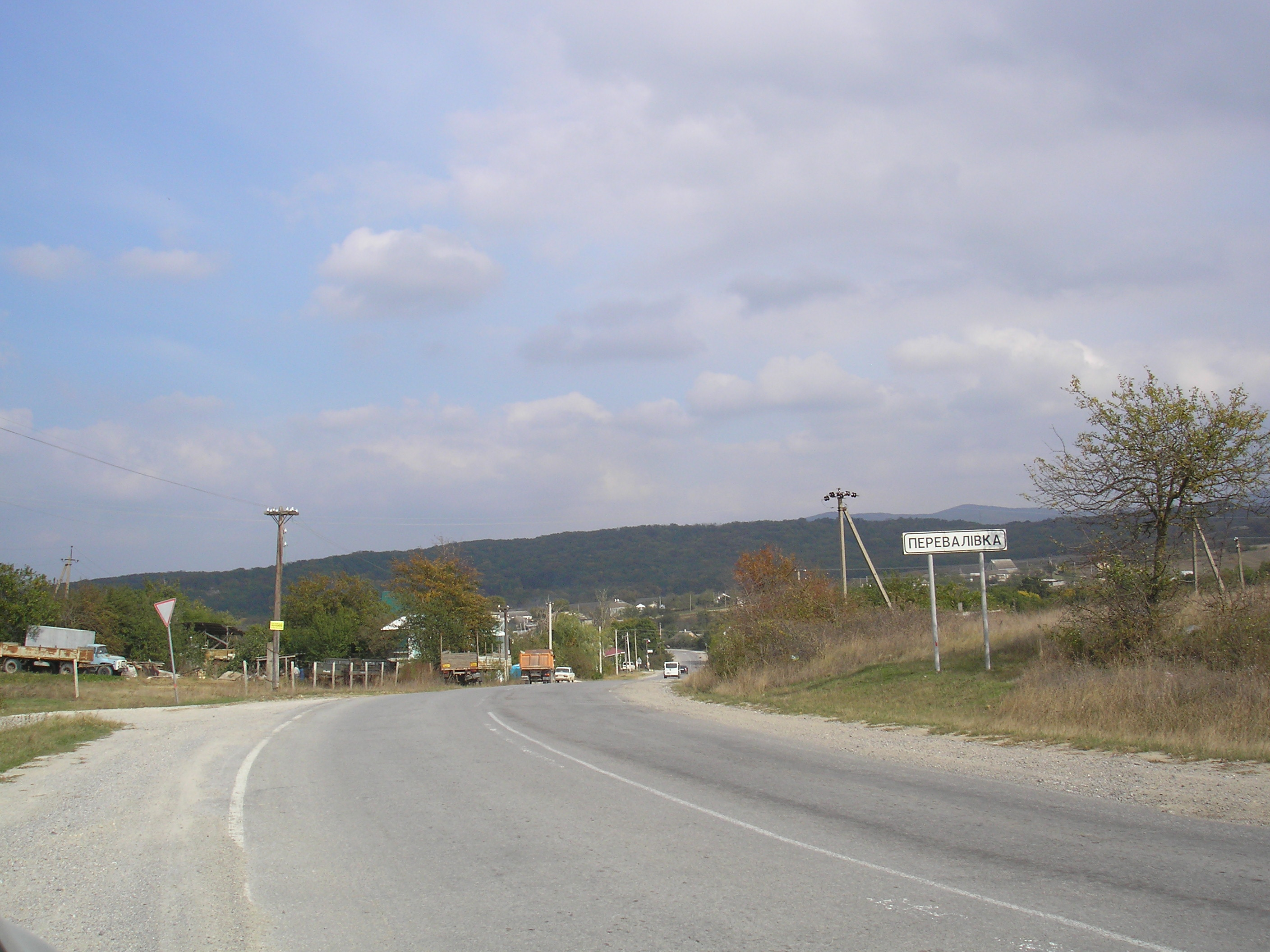
- View of the road to Perevalivka with the Crimean Mountains in the background.

- Location of Perevalivka in Crimea
- Coordinates: 44°58′25″N 34°58′43″E
- Republic: Crimea
- Municipality: Sudak Municipality
- First mentioned: 1381

Area
  - Total: 0.67 km^{2} (0.26 sq mi)
- Elevation: 387 m (1,270 ft)

Population (2014)
  - Total: 776
  - Density: 1,200/km^{2} (3,000/sq mi)
- Time zone: UTC+4 (MSK)
- Postal code: 98022
- Area code: +380 6566
- Website: http://rada.gov.ua/

Perevalivka (Ukrainian: Перевалівка; Russian: Переваловка) is a village in the Sudak Municipality of the Autonomous Republic of Crimea, a territory recognized by a majority of countries as part of Ukraine and annexed by Russia as the Republic of Crimea.

Previously, the settlement was known as the El-Buzlu village (Crimean Tatar: El Buzlu). Following the forced deportation of the Crimean Tatars in 1944, the Presidium of the Supreme Soviet of the Russian SFSR published a decree on May 18, 1948 renaming the settlement along with many others throughout Crimea from their native Crimean Tatar names to their current variants.

Perevalivka is located on Crimea's southern shore in the Crimean Mountains at an elevation of 387 m (1,270 ft). Its population was 687 in the 2001 Ukrainian census. Current population: 776 (2014 Census).
