= Bahativka, Crimea =

Bahativka Багатівка
- Village
- Location of Bahativka in Crimea
- Coordinates: 44°52′14″N 35°03′34″E
- Country: Ukraine
- Republic: Crimea
- Municipality: Sudak Municipality
- First mentioned: 1652

Area
  - Total: 1.4 km^{2} (0.54 sq mi)
- Elevation: 154 m (505 ft)

Population (2015)
  - Total: 902
  - Density: 640/km^{2} (1,700/sq mi)
- Time zone: UTC+4 (MSK)
- Postal code: 98026
- Area code: +380 6566
- Website: http://rada.gov.ua/

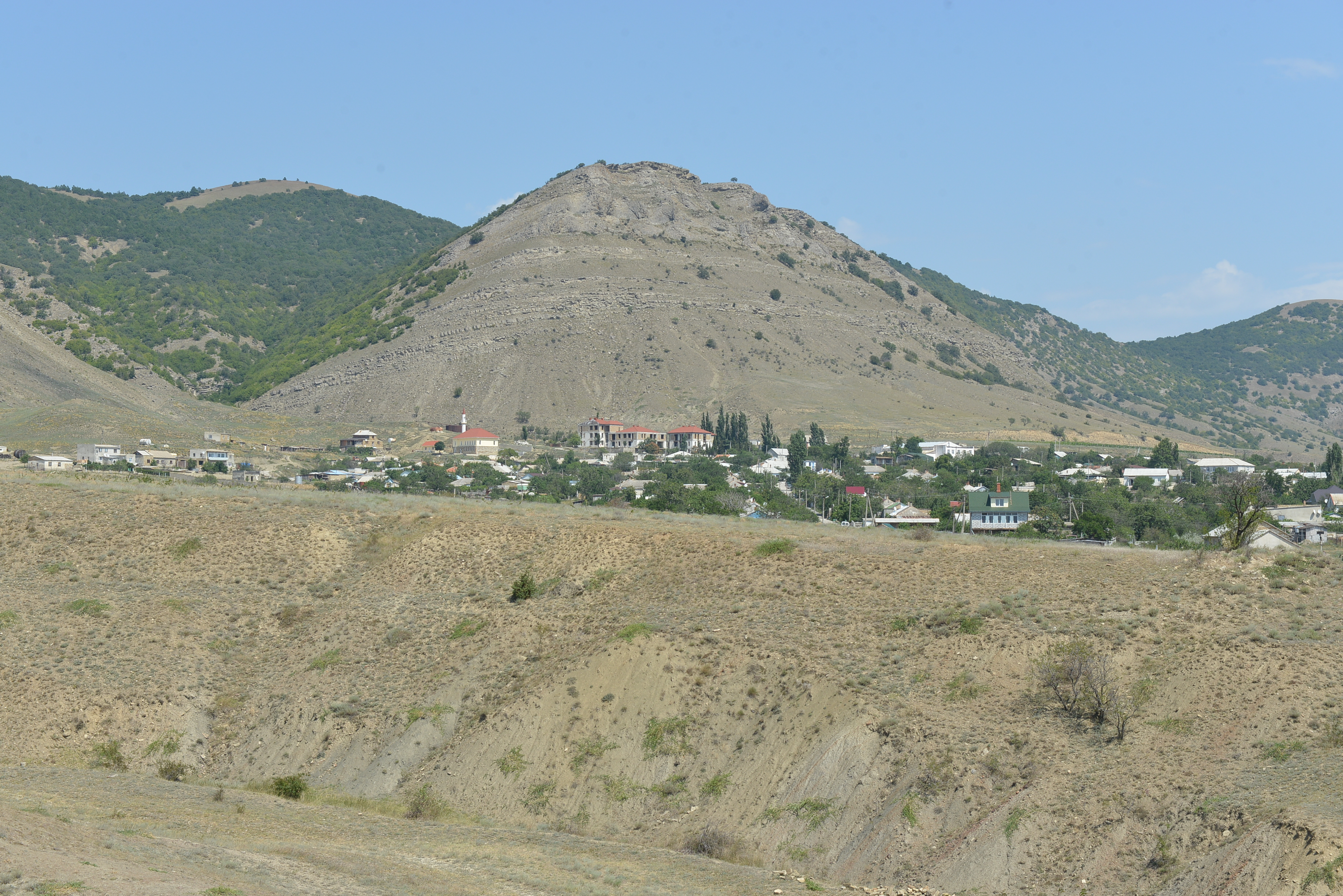

Bahativka or Bogatovka (Ukrainian: Багатівка; Russian: Богатовка) is a village in the Sudak Municipality of the Crimea, a territory recognized by a majority of countries as part of Ukraine and annexed by Russia as the Republic of Crimea.

The earliest mention of the village was in 1488, when the village was recorded under the name Tokluk as a timar in the Ottoman Empire, and was initially mainly a Christian village. By 1634, the population had largely converted to Islam, and during the 1783 Russian annexation of Crimea it came under the control of the Russian Empire. In 1944, following the forced deportation of the Crimean Tatars, the village was renamed to Bahativka.

== History ==
Previously, the settlement was known as the Tokluk village (Crimean Tatar: Toqluq). Tokluk is derived from the word toqlok and means satiety, fullness, or abundance, likely coming from the settlement's fertile surroundings, as it was known for its big harvests. The earliest written record of Tokluk comes from 1488, when it was stated as forming part of the timar of the Sudak fortress together with the now non-existent village of Kopsel in the Ottoman Empire. Together, the timar generates around 2,450 akçe. At the time of the mention, it was known that the population was mainly of the Christian faith. It was mentioned again in 1520, when it was recorded that the village had 17 households, but just two decades later, in 1542, the population was recorded as 13 households. By 1634, the Christian population had largely left or converted as one non-Muslim household remained. The last Christian family head in the Ottoman period's tax register was in 1652 for a Kalian Kanaki.

Following the 1783 Russian annexation of Crimea from the Ottoman Empire, the 1805 census recorded that the village had 15 households and a Tatar population of 88 people. The village grew significantly following this, and by the 1926 Soviet census, there were 134 households of which there were 504 residents, with the vast majority - 502 - being Tatars.

Following the forced deportation of the Crimean Tatars in 1944, the Presidium of the Supreme Soviet of the Russian SFSR published a decree on May 18, 1948 renaming the settlement along with many others throughout Crimea from their native Crimean Tatar names to their current variants.

Bahativka is located on Crimea's southern shore at an elevation of 154 metres (505 ft). Its population was 718 in the 2001 Ukrainian census. Current population: 902 (2014 Census).
