= Hromivka, Crimea =

Hromivka Громівка
- Village
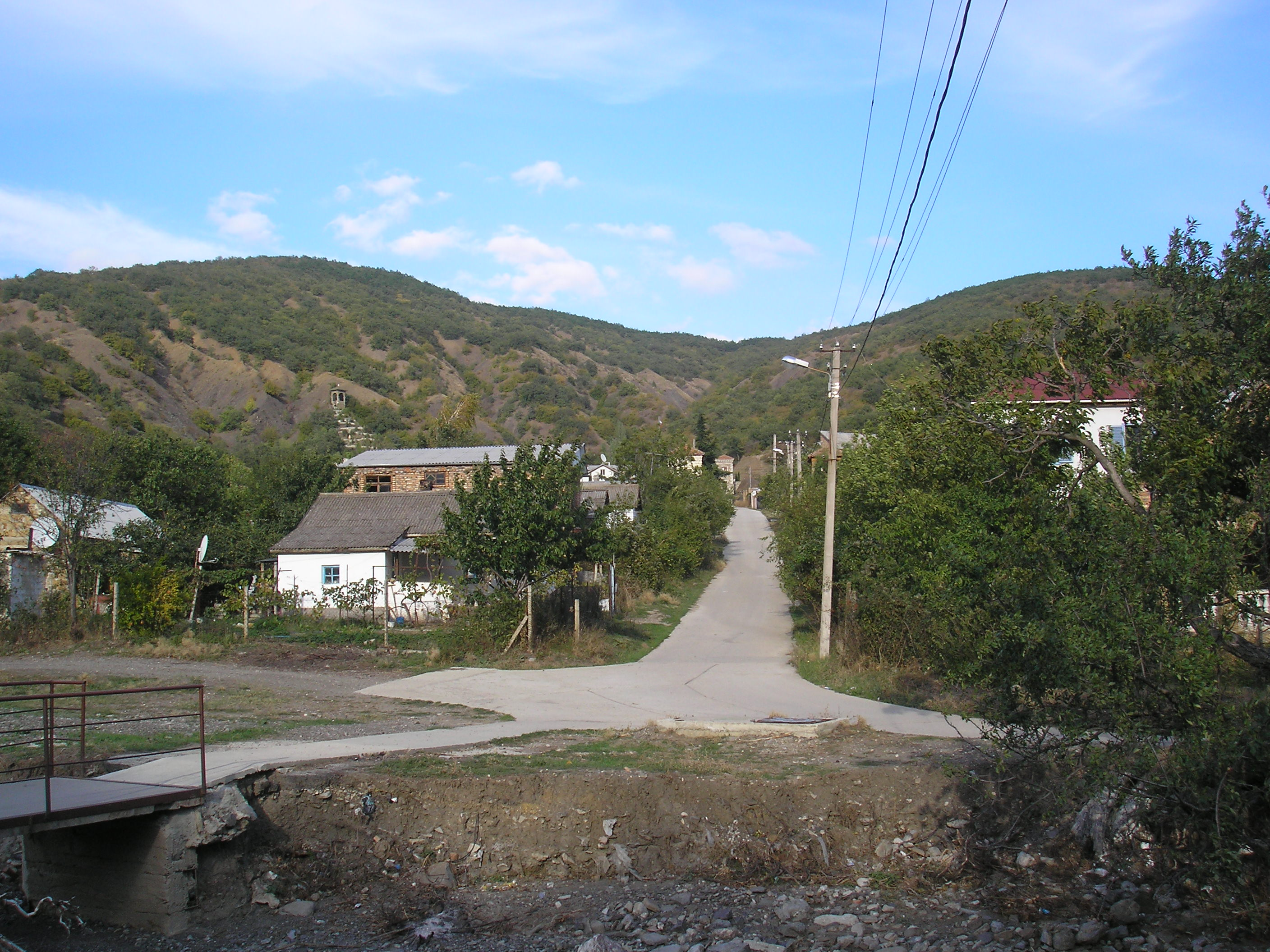
- View of one of Hromivka's streets.

- Location of Hromivka in Crimea
- Coordinates: 44°52′46″N 34°47′27″E
- Republic: Crimea
- Municipality: Sudak Municipality
- First mentioned: 1381
- Elevation: 217 m (712 ft)

Population (2014)
  - Total: 179
- Time zone: UTC+4 (MSK)
- Postal code: 298033
- Area code: +783 6566
- Website: http://rada.gov.ua/

Hromivka or Gromovka (Ukrainian: Громівка; Russian: Громовка(Gromovka)) is a village in the Sudak Municipality of the Crimea, a territory recognized by a majority of countries as part of Ukraine and annexed by Russia as the Republic of Crimea.

Previously, the settlement was known as the Shelen village (Crimean Tatar: Şelen). Following the forced deportation of the Crimean Tatars in 1944, the Presidium of the Supreme Soviet of the Russian SFSR published a decree on May 18, 1948 renaming the settlement along with many others throughout Crimea from their native Crimean Tatar names to their current variants.

Hromivka is located on Crimea's southern shore at an elevation of 217 metres (712 ft). Its population was 178 in the 2001 Ukrainian census. Current population: 179 (2014 Census).
