= Petro-Mykhailivka rural hromada =

Petro-Mykhailivka rural hromada Петро-Михайлівська селищна громада
- Hromada
- Interactive map of Petro-Mykhailivka rural hromada
- Country: Ukraine
- Oblast: Zaporizhzhia Oblast
- Raion: Zaporizhzhia Raion

Area
  - Total: 278.4 km^{2} (107.5 sq mi)

Population (2020)
  - Total: 4,908
  - Density: 17.63/km^{2} (45.66/sq mi)
- Settlements: 18
- Villages: 18

Petro-Mykhailivka rural hromada (Ukrainian: Петро-Михайлівська селищна громада) is a hromada of Ukraine, located in Zaporizhzhia Raion, Zaporizhzhia Oblast. Its administrative center is the village of Petro-Mykhailivka.

It has an area of 278.4 square kilometres (107.5 mi^{2}) and a population of 4908, as of 2020.

The hromada contains 18 settlements, which are all villages:

- Velykodubove
- Verbove
- Hnarovske
- Hrushivka
- Hubenske
- Dniprovka
- Kruhlyk
- Orlivske
- Perun
- Petro-Mykhailivka
- Petro-Svystunove
- Prydolynivka
- Tarasivka
- Ternivka
- Ulianivka
- Shevchenka
- Yakymivka
- Yasynuvate

== See also ==
- List of hromadas of Ukraine
