= RPC Fort =

Ukrainian weapons manufacturer

Research and Production Company Fort of the Ministry of Interior of Ukraine
- Type: State-owned company
- Industry: Defense
- Founded: 1991; 35 years ago
- Headquarters: Vinnytsia, Vinnytsia Oblast, Ukraine
- Key people: Vadym Rudnitsky, Director
- Products: Firearms, weapons
- Revenue: ▲ unknown
- Owner: Ministry of Internal Affairs (Ukraine)

Fort (Ukrainian: КП НВО "Форт" МВС України (full name), НВО "Форт" (short name)) is a Ukrainian weapons manufacturer from Vinnytsia, Ukraine.

== History ==
In 1991, a new company was formed to design and manufacture small arms for Ukrainian Interior Ministry, Security Service and State Border Service of Ukraine.

At the opening of Ukraine's only facility serially manufacturing small arms at Fort in March 1998, association officials announced that the plant in Vinnytsia, which over ₴5 million (about $1.2 million) had been invested in over two years, was capable of large-scale production of small arms.

The plant launched serial production of the Fort 12 pistol ordered primarily by the Ukrainian Interior Ministry. Pistol samples were also sent to Uzbekistan as an advance order, and to Russia.

At the opening, Fort director Viktor Pisarenko said that its design bureau had developed and prepared for production 8 models of short-barreled weapons and 4 models of long-barreled weapons. "Weapons from Vinnytsia surpass analogs, for instance the Makarov pistol, in many respects," he said.

By May 1998, Ukrainian Interior Ministry formations started receiving the first Fort-12 pistols manufactured in Vinnytsia. According to Fort chief engineer Evgeniy Bokovoj, all of Ukraine's army and police forces are supplied by the plant's output.

By March 2014, the plant developed over a dozen pistol and gun modifications, some of which were demonstrated at the IDEX-1999, IDEX-2001 and IDEF-2001 international arms exhibitions.

According to media reports, an agreement was signed in October 2000 for the delivery of a batch of Fort pistols to Uzbekistan. So far, it is the only country to which new Ukrainian small arms have been delivered, according to official press reports.

In October 2008, RPC Fort and Israel Weapon Industries reached an agreement to allow Fort to license-manufacture in Ukraine firearms such as the Tavor rifle system, the Negev light machinegun, and the Galatz sniper rifle, all of which were displayed at Fort's website as of early 2009.

The company has offered gun modernization services to upgrade AK-47, AK-74 and AKS-74 assault rifles to modern standards by adding picatinny rails to install scopes, foregrips and bipods with new pistol grips and buttstocks

In March 2025, the 13th National Guard of Ukraine Brigade reported that the Khartiya Brigade are using FORT-230 submachine guns to replace AKS-74 assault rifles.

== Products ==
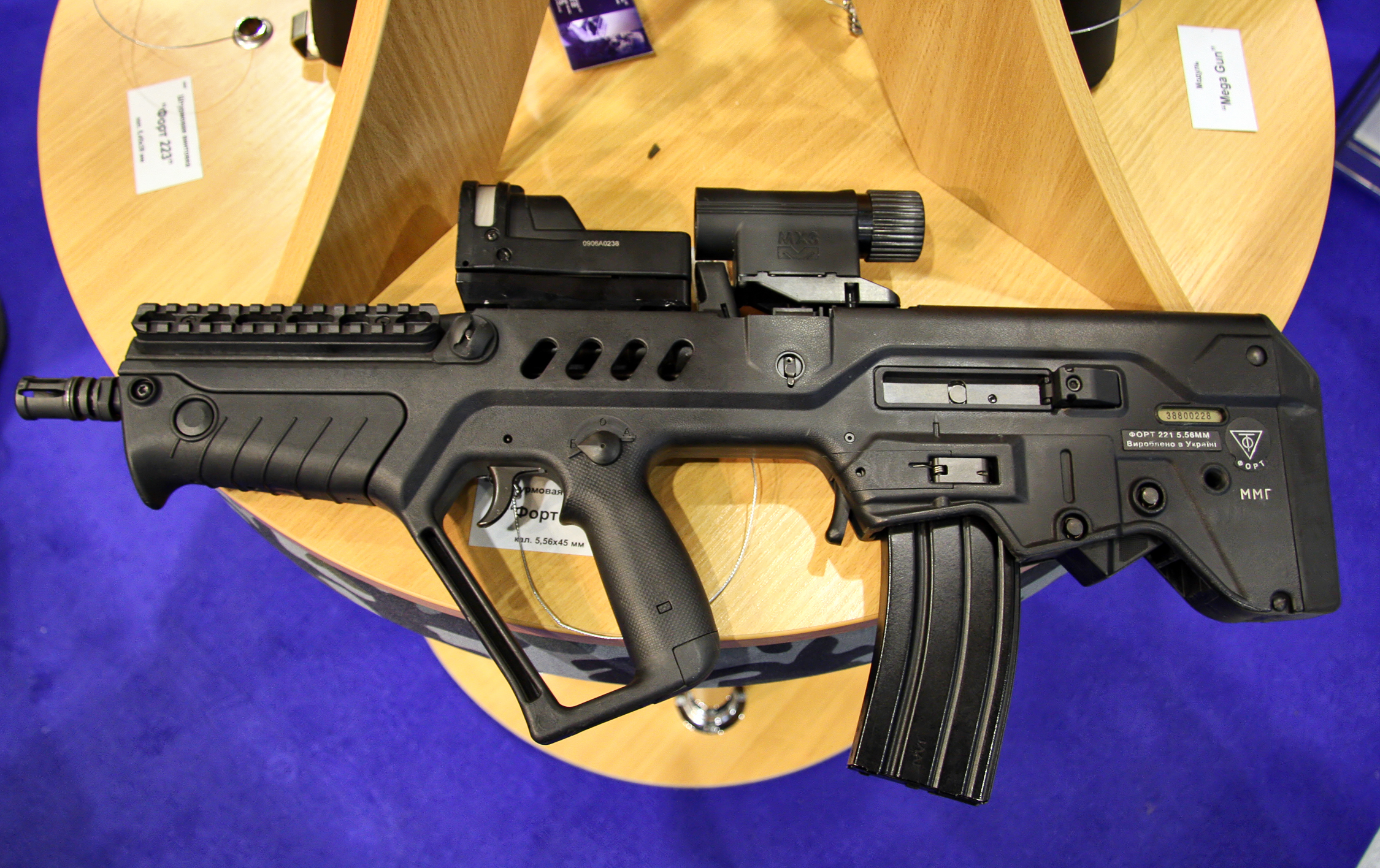
CTAR-21 produced under license by RPC Fort as Fort-221

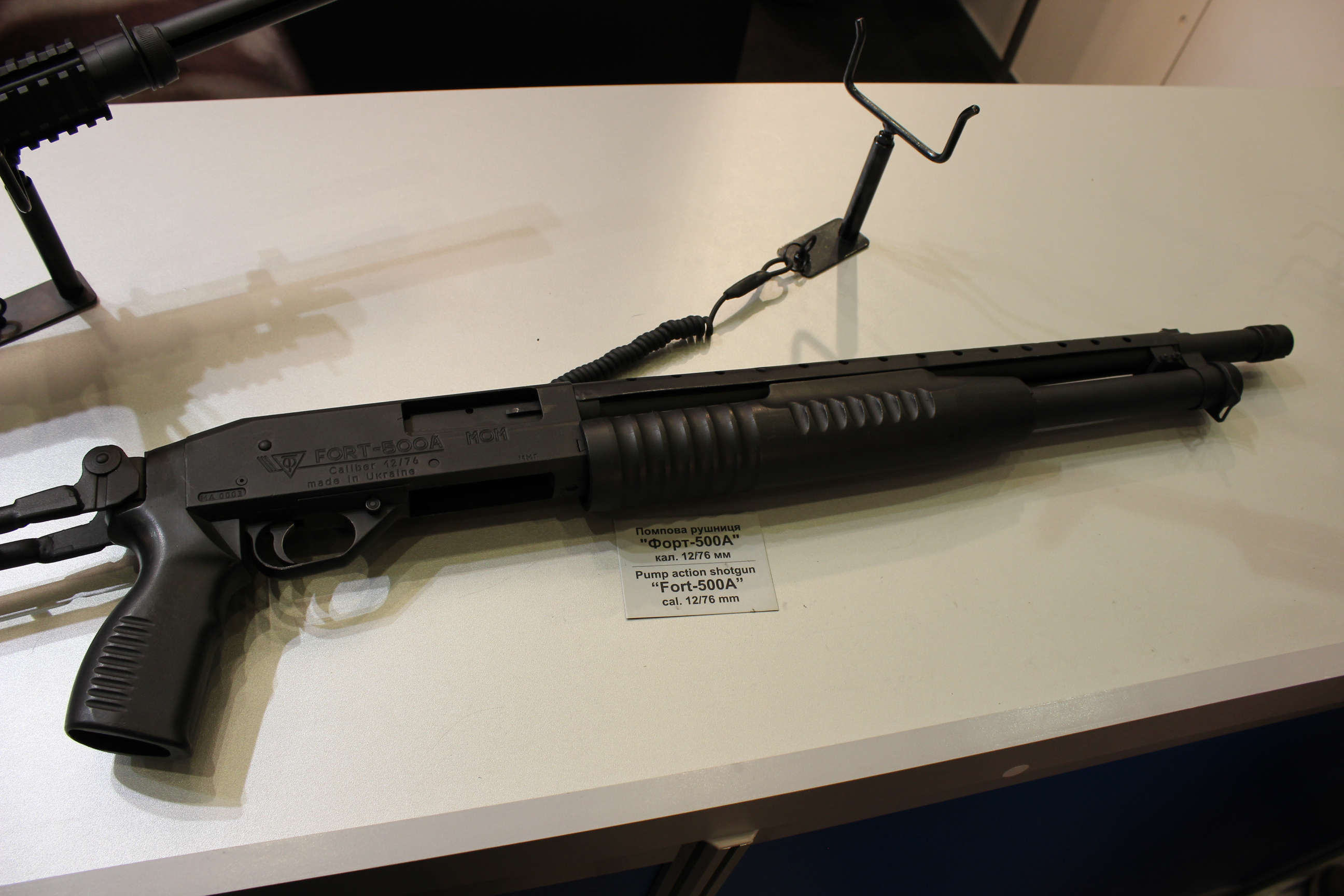
Fort-500 shotgun

=== Firearms ===
- Pistols:

- Fort-5
- Fort-12 (Fort-12-00, Fort-12-02 and Fort-12N variants)
- Fort-14 (Fort-14-00, Fort-14TP and Fort-14PP variants)
- Fort-15
- Fort-17
- Fort-20
- Fort-21 (Fort-21.01, Fort-21.02 and Fort-21.03 variants)
- Fort-28

- Submachine Guns:

- Fort-230
- Fort-226 (licensed modified version of the Micro Uzi)

- International Practical Shooting Confederation (IPSC) sport pistols:

- Sokil
- Berkut
- Kobra

- Pump-action shotguns:

- Fort-500 (FORT-500A, FORT-500M and FORT-500T variants)

- Rifles:

- single-shot bolt-action .22LR cadet rifles TOZ-8 OPF and TOZ-12 OPF
- several variants of self-loading AKM carbines - "Fort-201" (AKMS-MF with AKMS folding stock), "Fort-202" (AKMS-MF with new metal folding stock), "Fort-205" (AKM-MF with AKM wooden stock), "Fort-206" (AKMT-MF with black plastic handguard and new telescoping stock)
- several variants of self-loading SKS carbines - SKS-MF (Soviet SKS without bayonet) and "Fort-207" (Soviet SKS with black plastic handguard and new telescoping stock)
- several variants of Tavor TAR-21 (Fort-221, Fort-222, Fort-223, Fort-224)
- several variants of IWI Galil ACE (Fort-227, Fort-228, Fort-229)
- "Fort-250" (prototype, presented in 2018)

- Sniper rifles:

- "Fort-301" (Galatz sniper rifle)

- Machine guns:

- Fort-401

- Grenade launcher:

- Fort-600

==== Non-Lethal Pistol Variants ====
- Fort-5R
- Fort-6R
- Fort-10R
- Fort-12R
- Fort-12RM
- Fort-12T
- Fort-13R
- Fort-17R
- Fort-17T
- Fort-18R
- Fort-D

==== Gas pistols ====
- Fort-5G and Fort-12G

==== Equipment ====
- Police batons, handcuffs, etc.

== See also ==
- Mayak (uk:Завод «Маяк» (Київ))
- Zbroyar (uk:Zbroyar)
