= Shevchenkove (rural settlement) =

Rural locality in Kharkiv Oblast, Ukraine

Shevchenkove Шевченкове
- Rural settlement
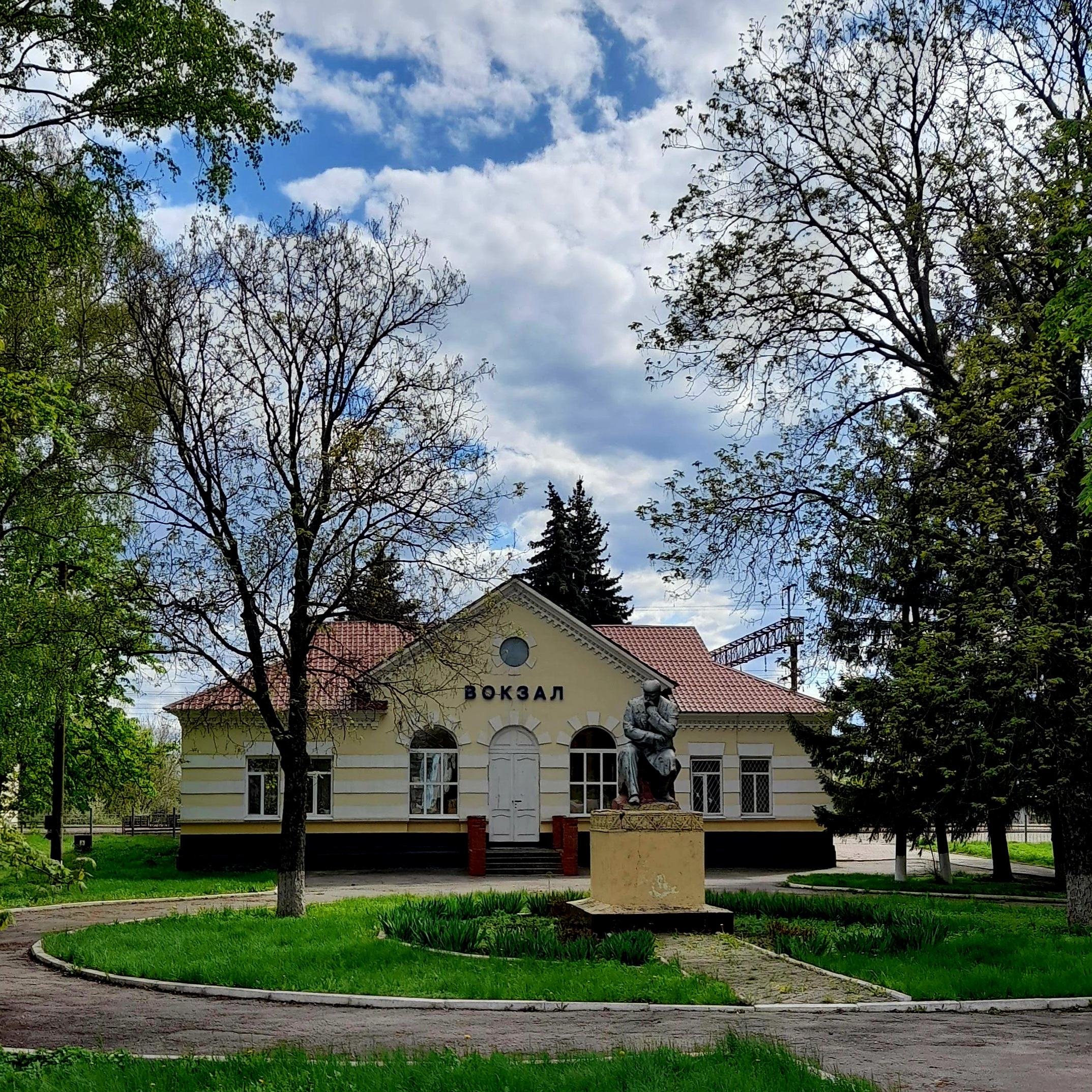
- Shevchenkove Railway Station, Monument to Taras Shevchenko

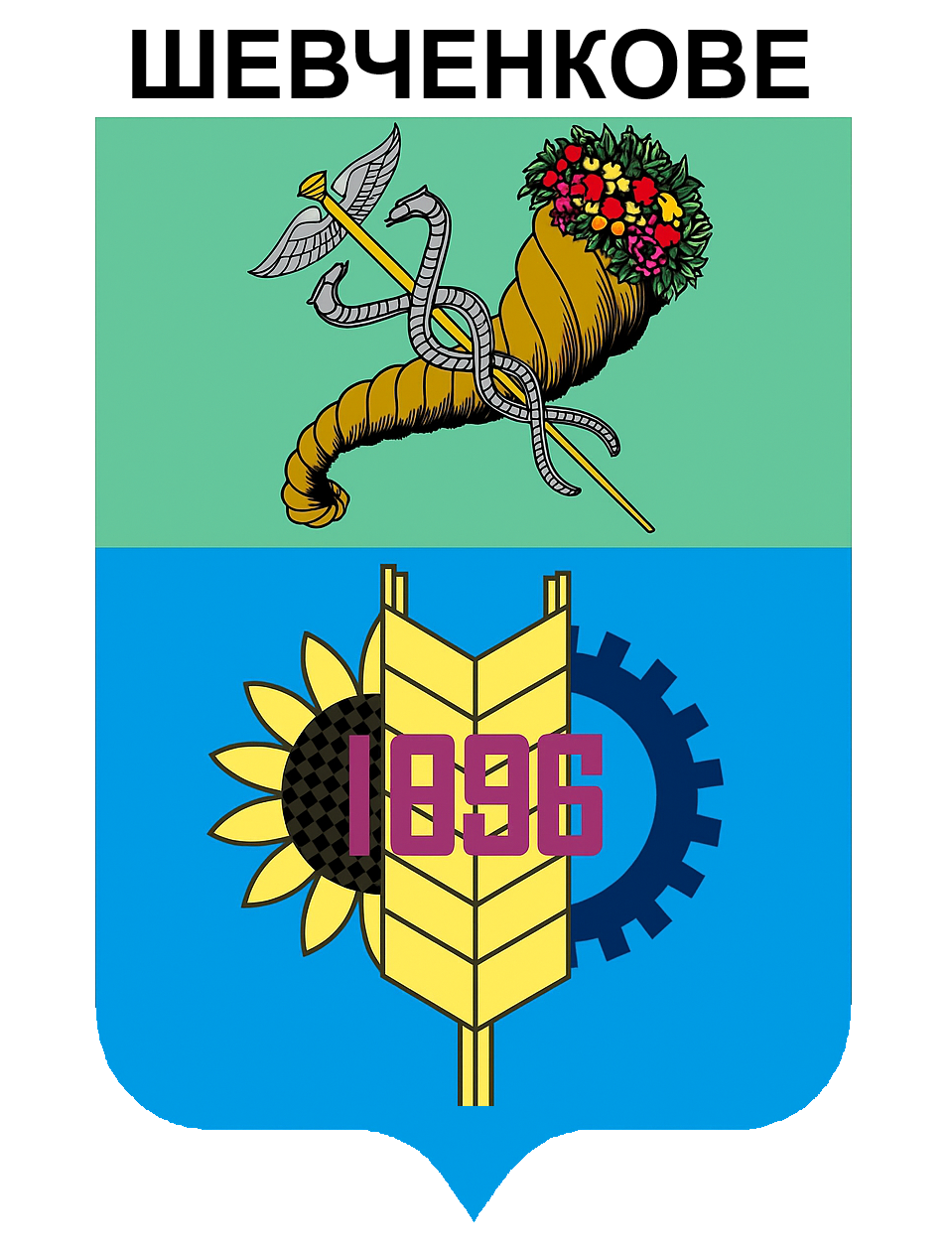
- Flag Coat of arms
- Interactive map of Shevchenkove
- Location in Kharkiv Oblast Location in Ukraine
- Coordinates: 49°41′37″N 37°10′25″E
- Country: Ukraine
- Oblast: Kharkiv Oblast
- Raion: Kupiansk Raion
- Hromada: Shevchenkove settlement hromada
- Established: 1896

Government
  - Mayor: Valeriy Prykhodko
- Elevation: 113 m (371 ft)

Population (2022)
  - Total: ▼6,627
- Time zone: UTC+2 (CET)
  - Summer (DST): UTC+3 (CEST)
- Postal code: 63601
- Area code: +380 5751
- Website: http://shevselrada.gov.ua

Shevchenkove (Ukrainian: Шевченкове, pronounced [ʃeu̯ˈt͡ʃɛnkowe], Russian: Шевченково) is a rural settlement in Kupiansk Raion, Kharkiv Oblast, Ukraine. It hosts the administration of Shevchenkove settlement hromada, one of the hromadas of Ukraine. Population: 6,627 (2022 estimate). The main railway station in Schevchenkove is Schevchenkove-South.

== Geography ==
The village of Shevchenkove is located 80 km southeast of the Kharkiv city between the Velykyi Burluk and Srednyaya Balakleyka rivers. The villages of Zoryanskoye and Ogurtsovka adjoin the village.

== History ==
=== Early history ===
In 1896, the settlement was founded as the village of Bulatselovka named after the owner of that land, Bulacel, a descendant of the Romanian boyars who owned land in the area. It was located inin the Staroverovskaya Volost of the Kupyansky Uyezd, Kharkov Governorate of the Russian Empire. In 1896, the Bulatselivka station was built, around which, in the early 20th century, the Bulatselivka farmstead arose on the lands of the Bulatseliv landowners, who owned vast tracts of land in what is now the Shevchenkivskyi District. The construction of the Kharkiv-Belgorod railway was completed in 1899.

At the station, station buildings and a number of outbuildings belonging to merchants and traders were built. By 1905, there were seven barns and numerous shops. At the same time, peasants and artisans began to settle on the farmstead: blacksmiths, saddlers, and tailors. By 1914, Bulatselovka had a population of about 100. As a result of the Stolypin agrarian reform, stratification among the Bulatselovka peasants increased. The poor became increasingly impoverished, and their land passed into the hands of wealthy landowners.

=== Part of the Soviet Union ===
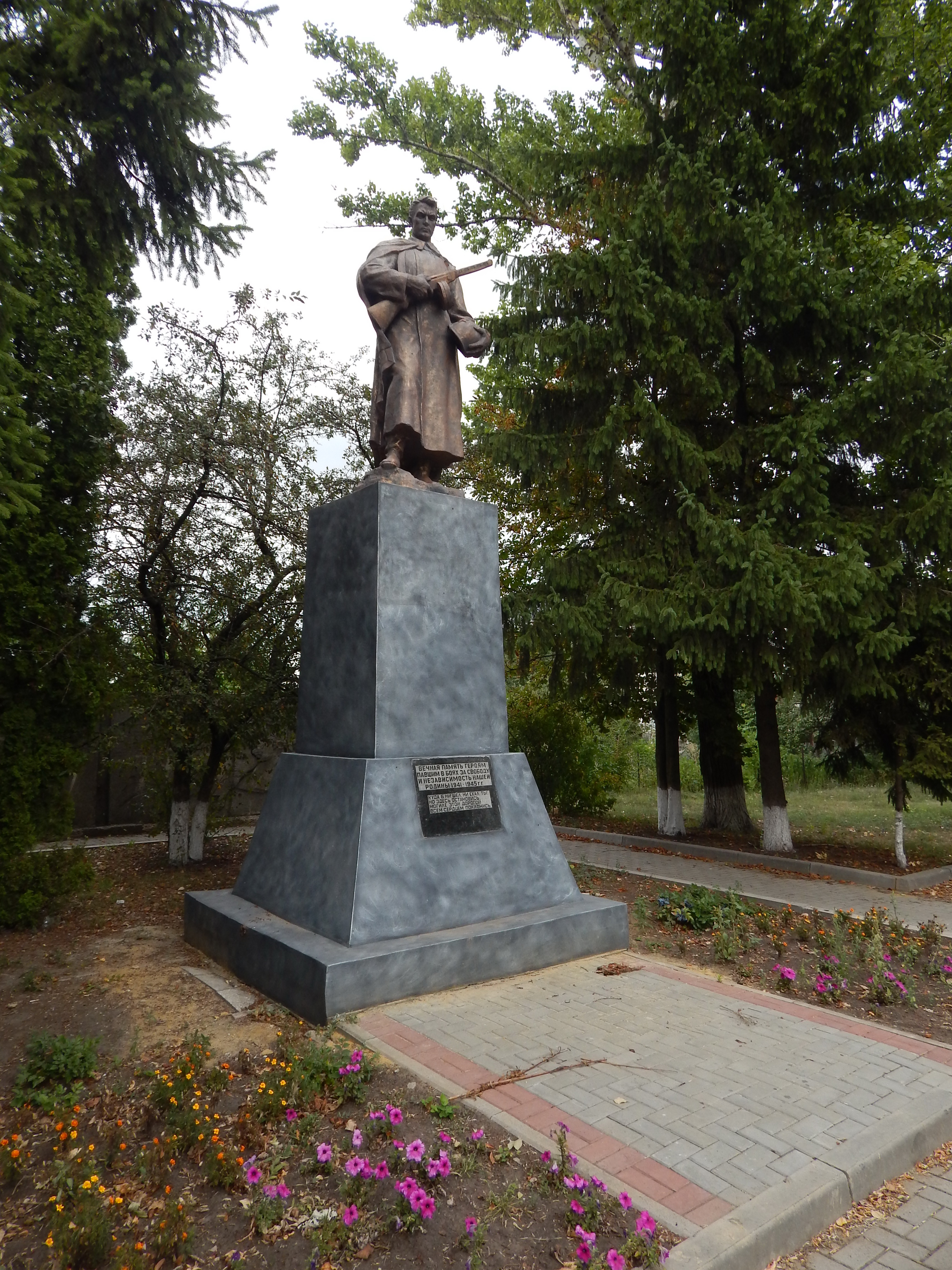
Mass grave of Soviet soldiers fallen during the World War II.

In 1922, the village was renamed "Shevchenkovo" in honor of the poet Taras Shevchenko. A local newspaper is published here since February 1935. During the Great Patriotic War, the village was occupied by German troops on February 22, 1942, and liberated by Soviet troops on February 4, 1943. At the time of liberation, the population was only 250 people.

Shevchenkove has been considered an urban-type settlement since 1957. In 1962 it lost the status of a district center (due to the dissolution of the Shevchenkivskyi Raion), and on January 1, 1965, it again received the status of a district center. The population in 1966 was 2,812 people. In 1978, the largest enterprise in the village was a grain processing plant. In January 1989 the population was 7,856 people.

=== Independent Ukraine ===
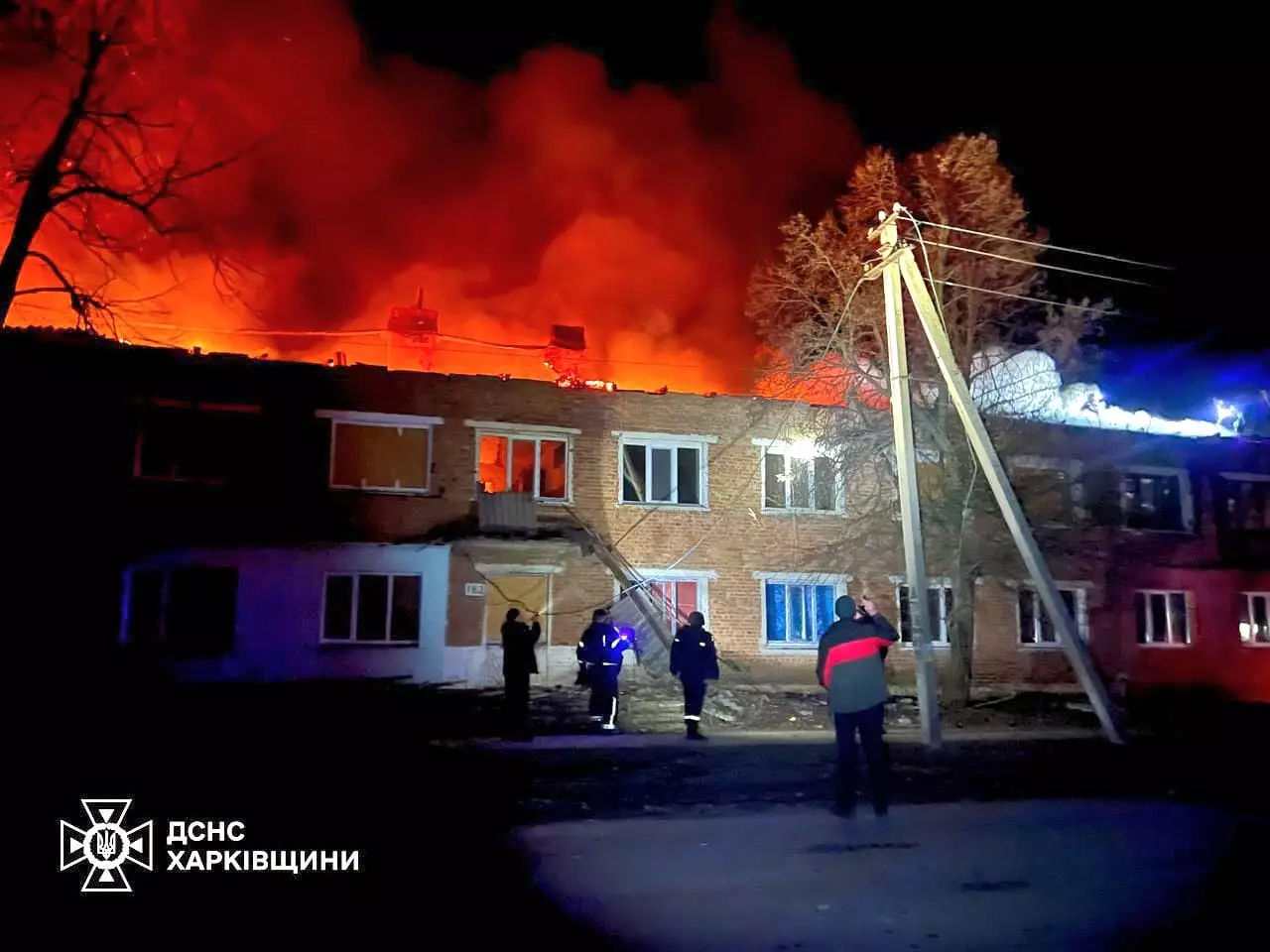
A house in the village of Shevchenkove in the Kharkiv region after a Russian drone strike on the night in March 2026.

By January 2013 the population was 7,100 people, and by January 2018 the population was 6,875 people. The settlement contains a railway station and a three-star hotel, the Kharkiv.

Until 18 July 2020, Shevchenkove was the administrative center of Shevchenkove Raion. The raion was abolished in July 2020 as part of the administrative reform of Ukraine, which reduced the number of raions of Kharkiv Oblast to seven, and the area of Shevchenkove Raion was merged into Kupiansk Raion.

Shevchenkove was occupied by Russian forces on 26 February 2022, during the Russian invasion of Ukraine. After over six months of occupation, the Ukrainian military recaptured the settlement on 7 September 2022.

Until 26 January 2024, Shevchenkove was designated urban-type settlement. On this day, a new law entered into force which abolished this status, and Shevchenkove became a rural settlement. In February 2024, the population was about 4,000 people, which was 60% of the pre-war population.

== Economy ==
=== Transport ===
It has railway station Shevchenkovo-Yuzhnoye (Bulacelovka) on the line Kharkov - Kupiansk-Vuzlovyi Southern Railway. Also, the T-2110 and Р-07 highways pass through the village.

=== Enteprises ===
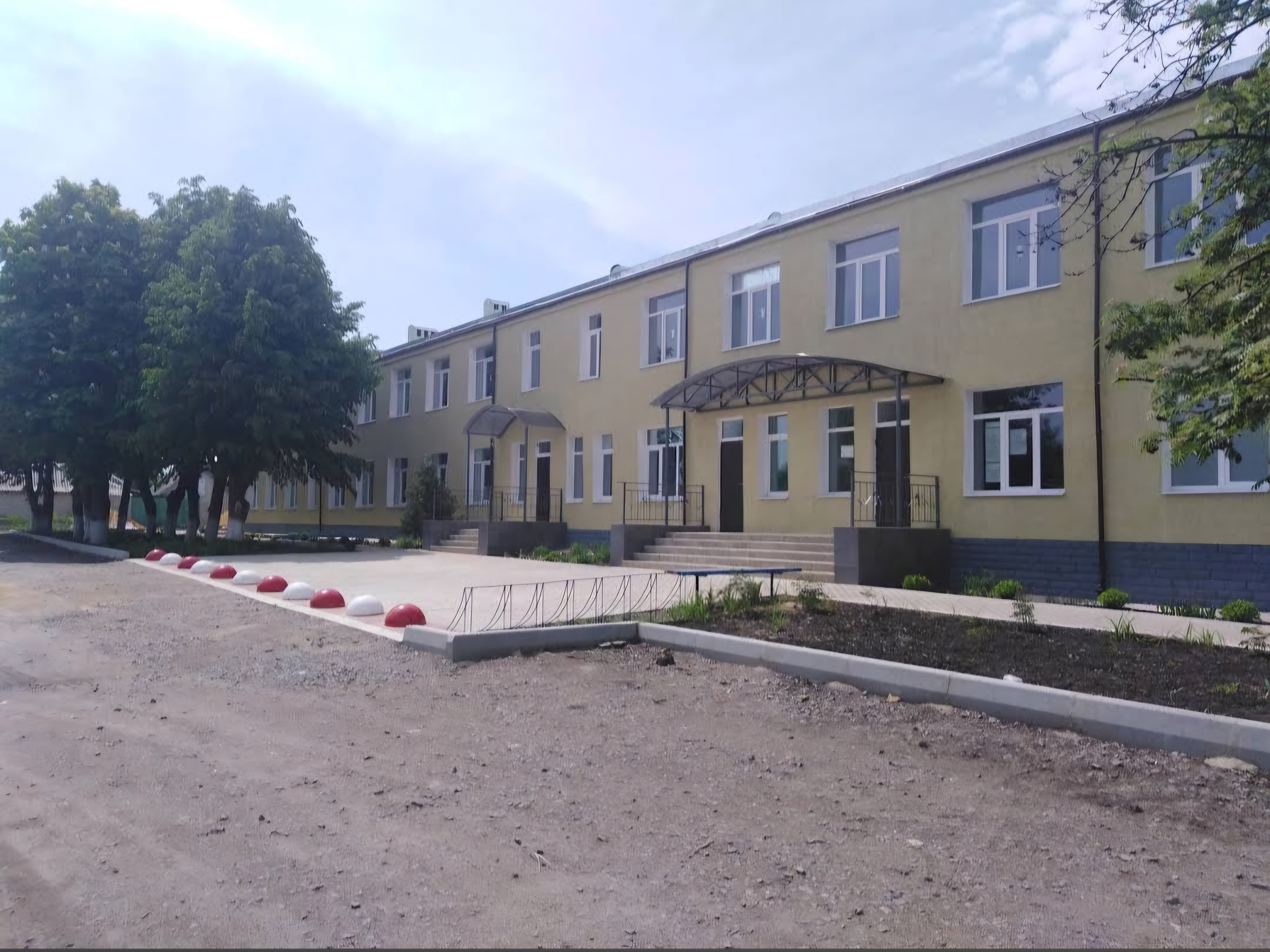
District Hospital.

- CJSC "Shevchenko Bread Products Plant",
- Feed mill,
- Shevchenko Food Products Plant, LLC,
- Shevchenko Rassvet LLC,
- CJSC "Shevchenkovskaya Agricultural Technology",
- Shevchenko hatchery station,
- Shevchenko food flavoring factory,
- LLC "Plemzavod "Shevchenkovsky"",
- Shevchenkivskyi District Consumers' Union,
- Shevchenkivskyi Sausage Factory.

== Social sphere ==
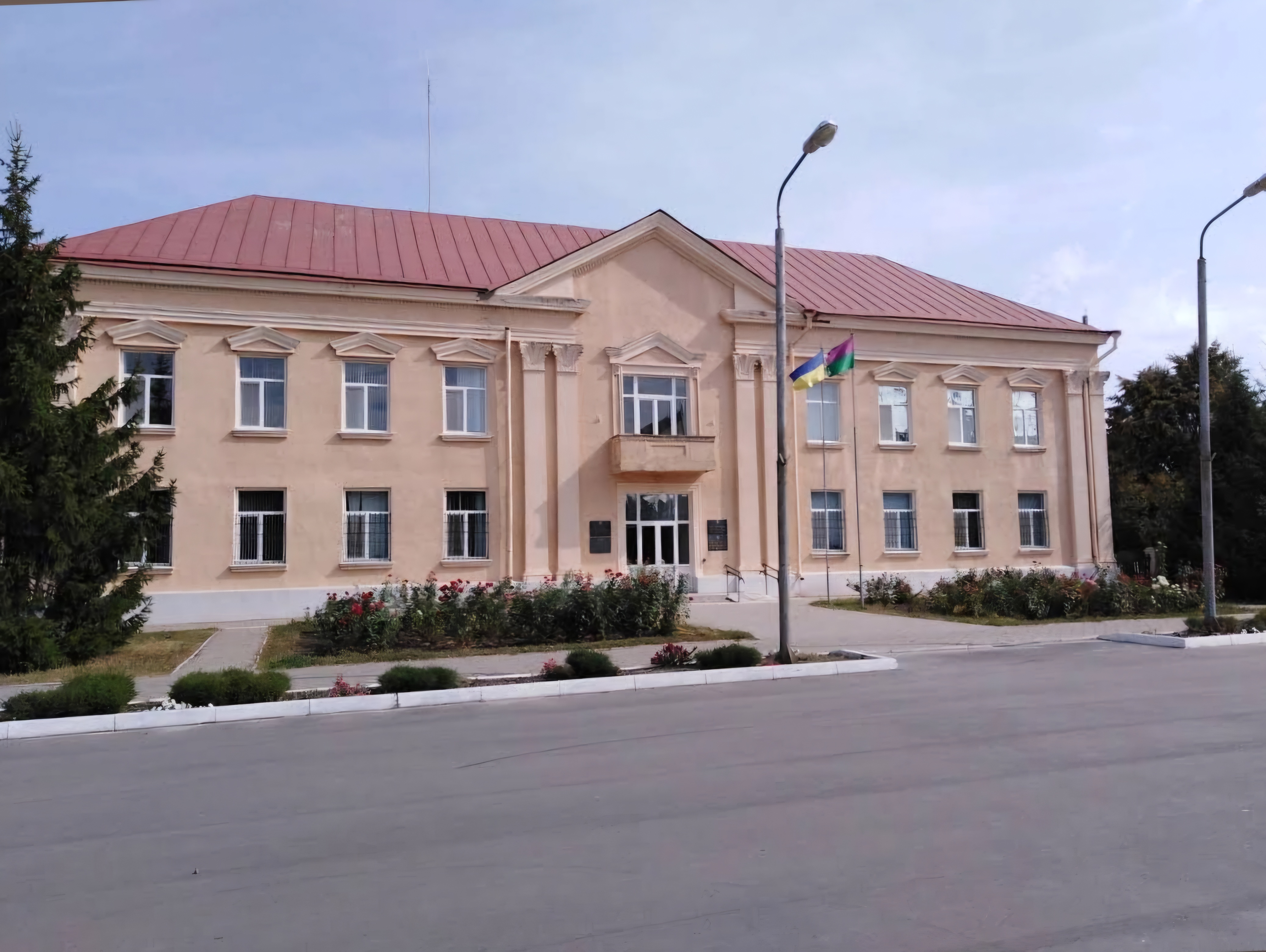
Administrative building on the main square.

- Kindergarten,
- Two schools,
- Vocational Agricultural Lyceum,
- Shevchenkovka Central District Hospital,
- Polyclinic,
- Shevchenkovka Orphanage,
- Shevchenkovka Ambulance Station,
- Community Center,
- Stadium.

== Demographics ==
As of the Ukrainian national census in 2001, Shevchenkove had a population of 7,306 inhabitants. The linguistic composition of the population was as follows:

Native languages in Shevchenkove
	percent
Ukrainian	91.6%
Russian	7.8%
Belarusian	0.2%
Armenian	0.2%
Romanian	0.1%
others	0.1%

== Attractions ==
- A mass grave of Soviet soldiers and a memorial to fellow soldiers. 236 soldiers are buried there. In 1975, a major reconstruction was carried out at the grave, and a memorial complex was created.
- A monument to Soviet soldiers who liberated the city in 1943, unveiled in 1983.
- A monument to Taras Shevchenko, unveiled in 1957 near the train station.
- A monument to Taras Shevchenko, unveiled in 2001 in the central square.
- The Holy Trinity Church of the Izyum Diocese of the Ukrainian Orthodox Church.

== Gallery ==
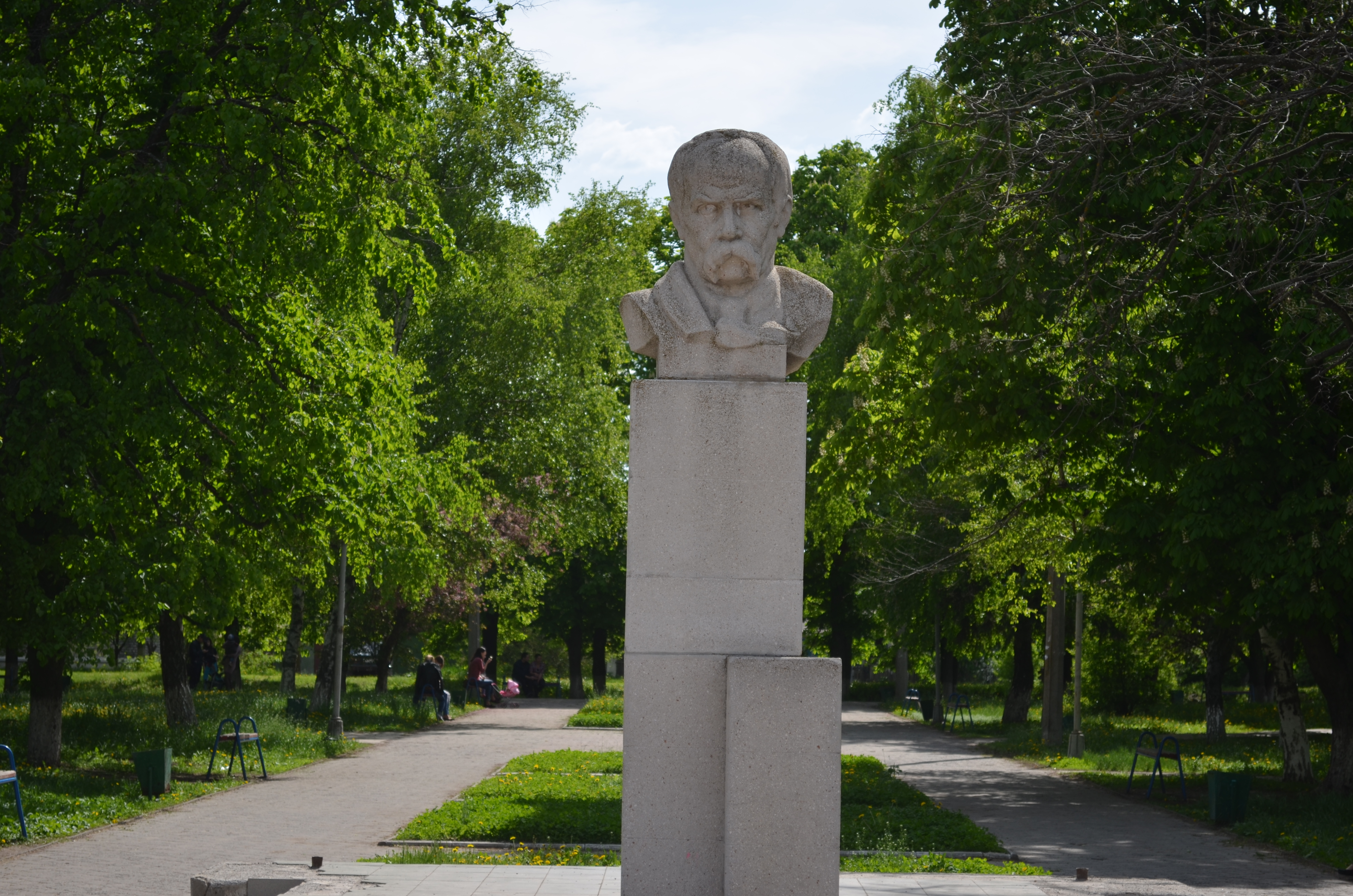
Bust of Taras Shevchenko, Shevchenkove, Kharkiv Oblast

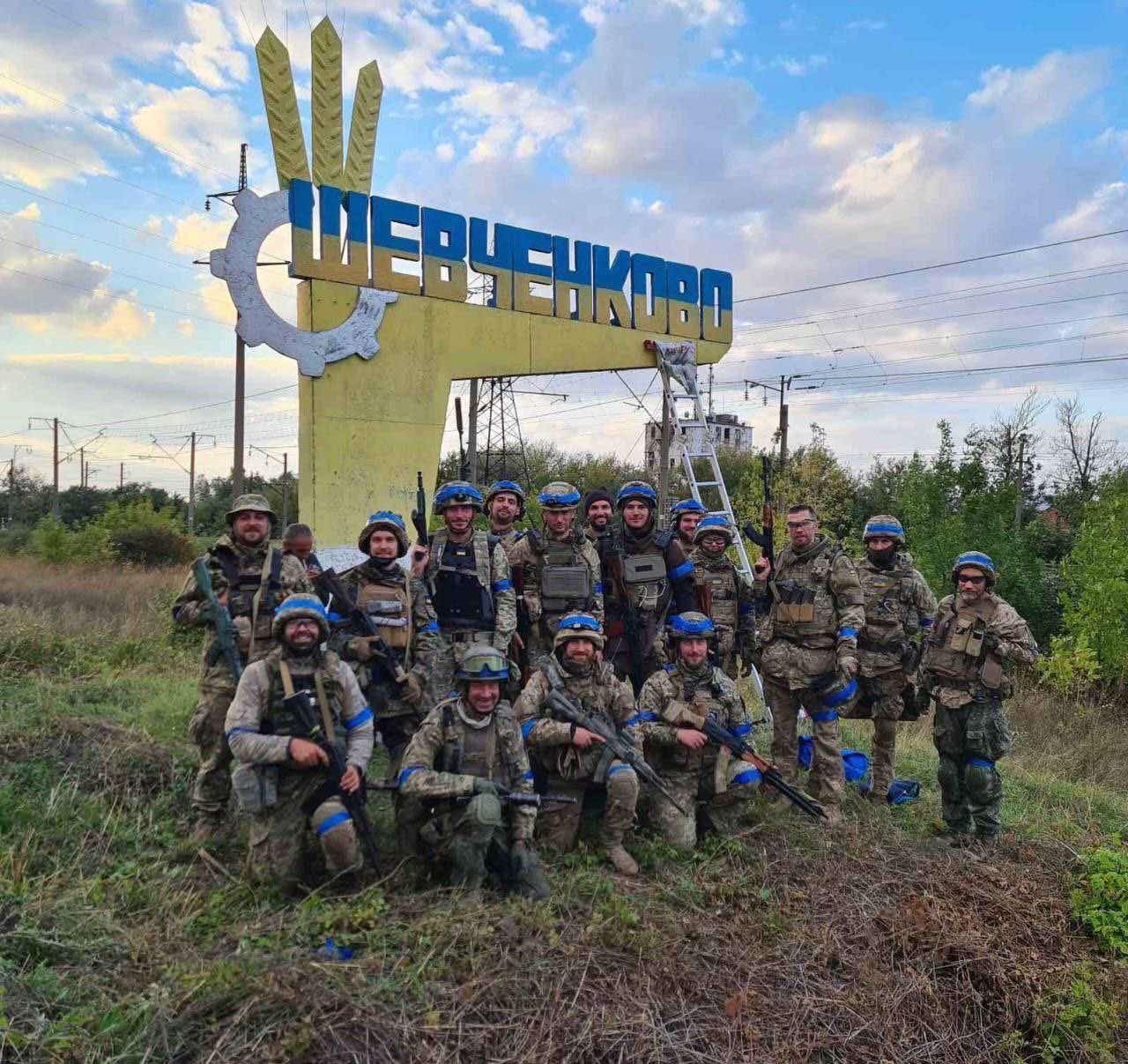
Soldiers of the Territorial Defence Forces of Ukraine (the 112th Brigade) near the freshly repainted (from Russian flag colors into Ukrainian ones) entrance mark in Shevchenkove, retaken after the Kharkiv counteroffensive

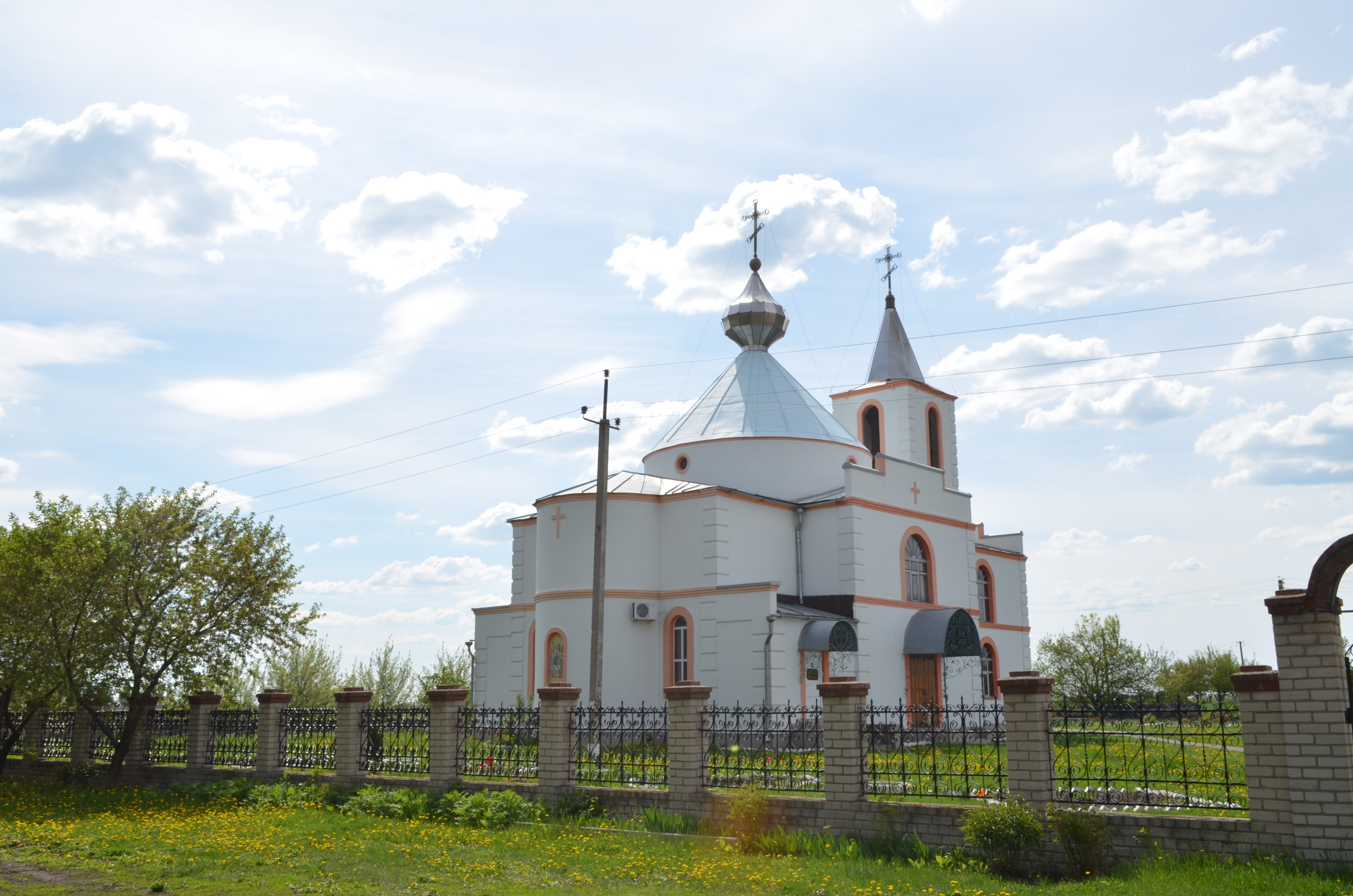
Shevchenkove Holy Trinity Church

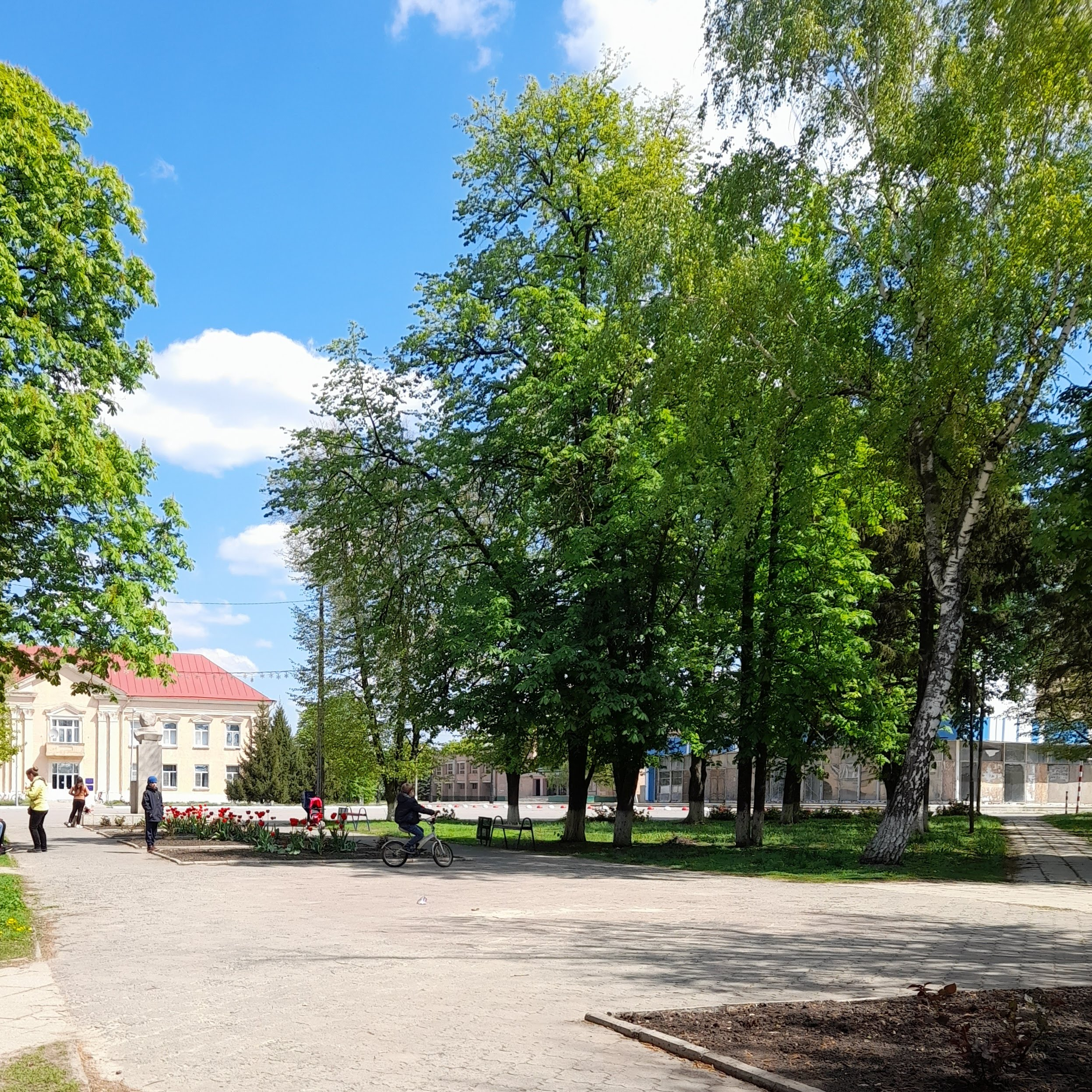
Central Park

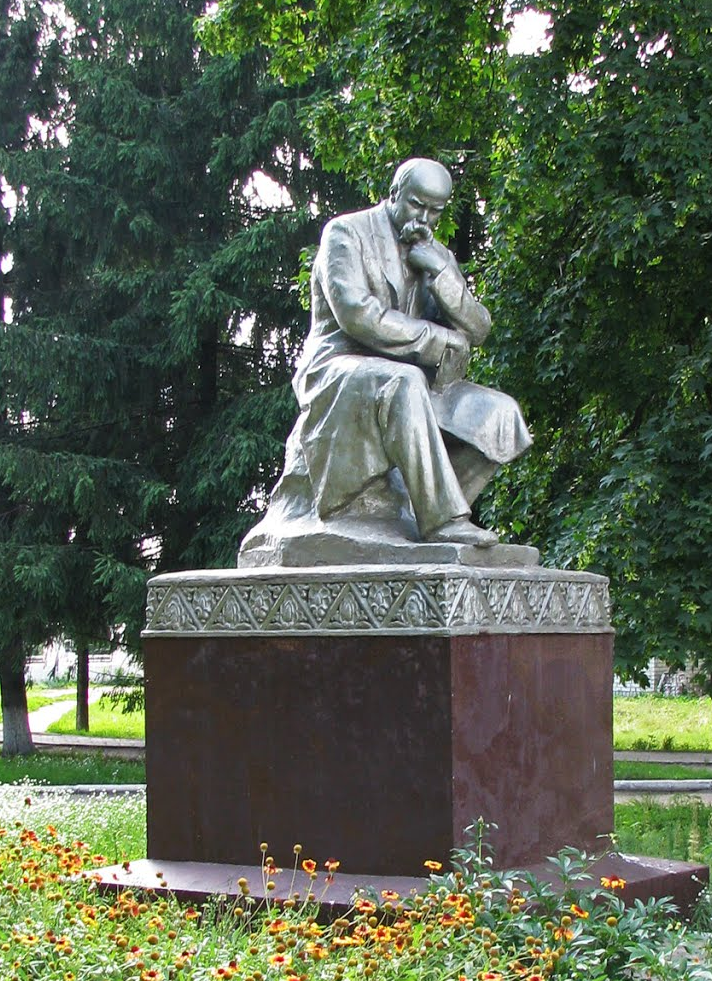
Memorial of Taras Shevchenko

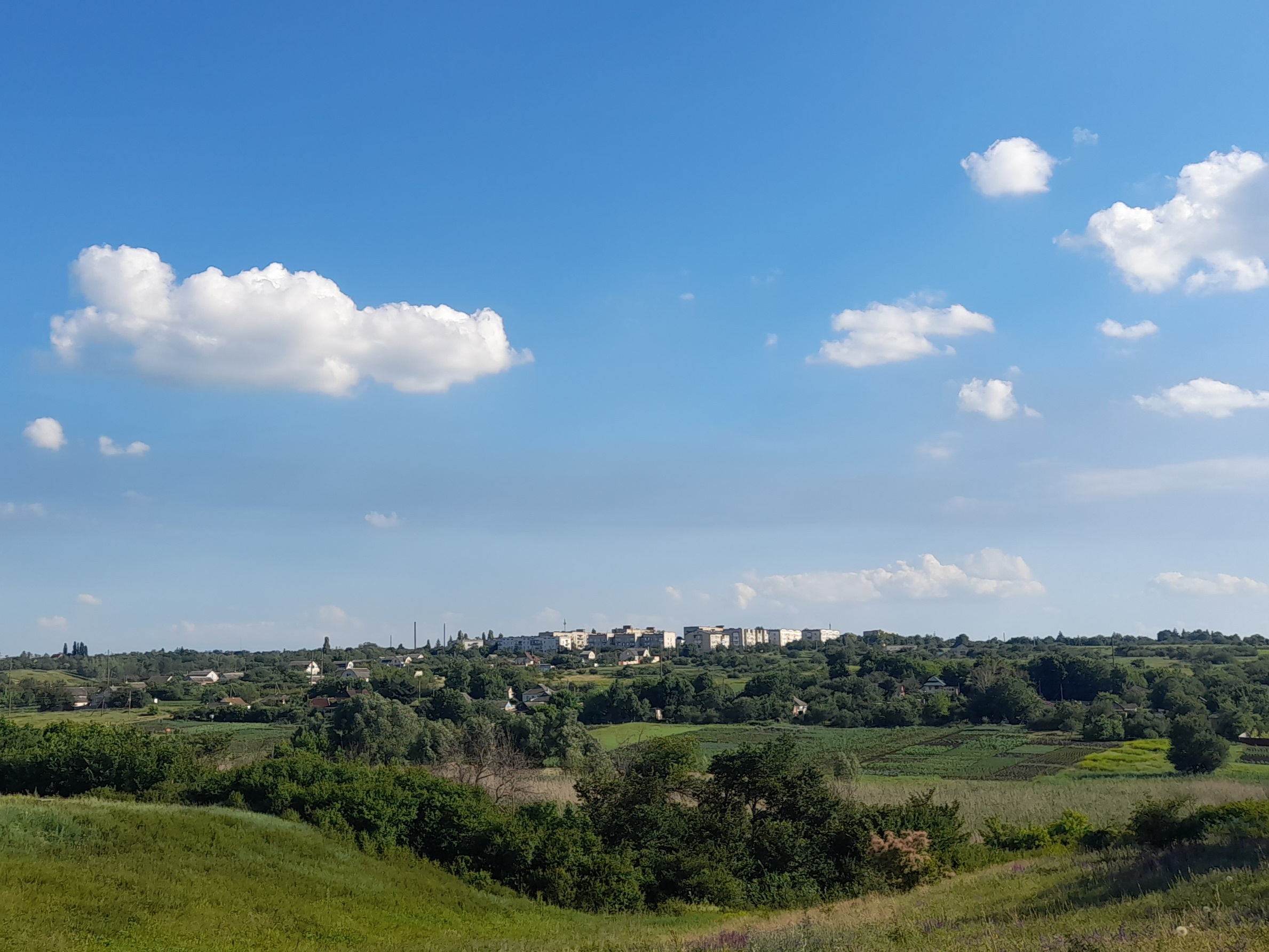
Landscape
