= Fort-17 =

Semi-automatic pistol

Fort 17
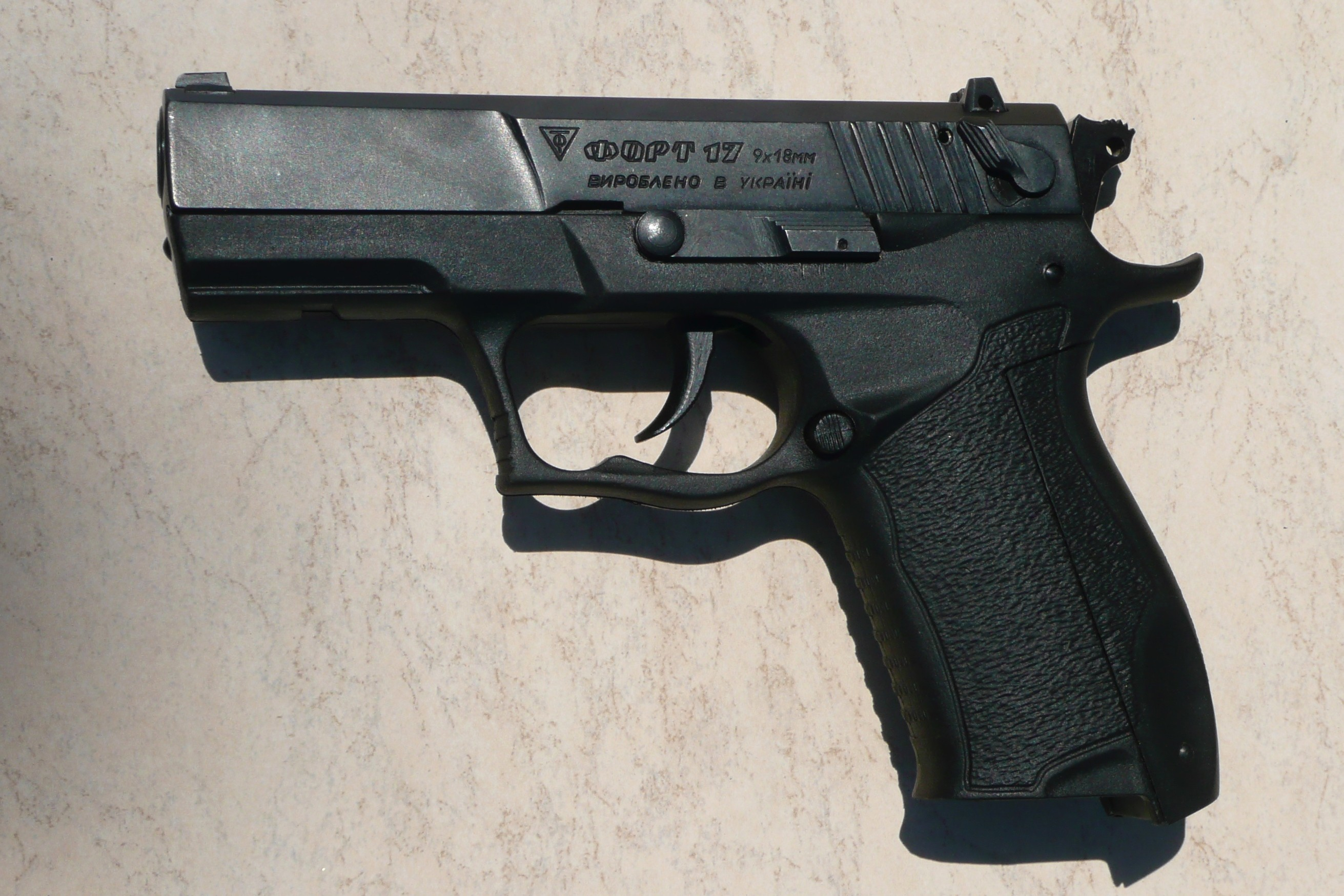
- Type: Semi-automatic pistol
- Place of origin: Ukraine

Service history
- In service: 2004–present
- Wars: Russo-Ukrainian War

Production history
- Manufacturer: RPC Fort
- Produced: 2004–present

Specifications
- Mass: 680 g (empty); 810 g (loaded)
- Length: 180 mm
- Barrel length: 95 mm
- Width: 32 mm
- Height: 130 mm
- Cartridge: 9×18mm Makarov; 9×17mm
- Caliber: 9mm
- Action: Single/Double Action, semiautomatic
- Rate of fire: 40 rounds per minute
- Muzzle velocity: 325 m/s
- Feed system: 13 round box magazine

The Fort 17 (Ukrainian: Форт-17) is a semi-automatic pistol which was designed in the year 2004 by Ukrainian firearms designer RPC Fort.

== Design details ==
The pistol is similar to the Fort 12, but as it's made of polymer, the Fort-17 is much lighter than its predecessor.

The Fort-17 also features a removable grip backstrap to fit a particular shooter's grip.

== Variants ==
English	Ukrainian	Cartridge	Description	Reference
Fort-17	Форт-17	9×18mm Makarov		
Fort-17 CURZ	Форт-17 CURZ	9 mm Kurz		
Kobra	Кобра	9×18mm Makarov	IPSC sport pistol	
Kordon	Кордон	.22 Long Rifle	Sporting pistol;10 rounds box magazine	
Fort 17R	Форт-17Р	Rubber bullets	Non-lethal gas pistol	
Fort 17T	Форт-17T	Rubber bullets	Non-lethal gas pistol	

== Accessories ==
English name	Ukrainian name	Description	Reference
LT-6A	ЛТ-6А	Gun-mounted flashlight	
Migdal	Мигдаль	A helmet-mounted weapon accessory invented for special forces; it allows its operator to both see and attack an armed target using a periscope-like lens, without exposing the operator to counterattack	

== Users ==
- Ukraine
  - Ukrainian Army
  - Ukrhydroenergo
  - Ministry of Internal Affairs
  - National Police of Ukraine
  - State Savings Bank of Ukraine
- Lugansk People's Republic (Note: At least several pistols)

=== Former ===
- Russian Federation (Note: Imports were allowed since 2007 until July 2011 Since August 2014, Ukraine have banned the export of arms and military products to Russia, including magazines and other spare parts for previously sold pistols.)
