= Fort-12 =

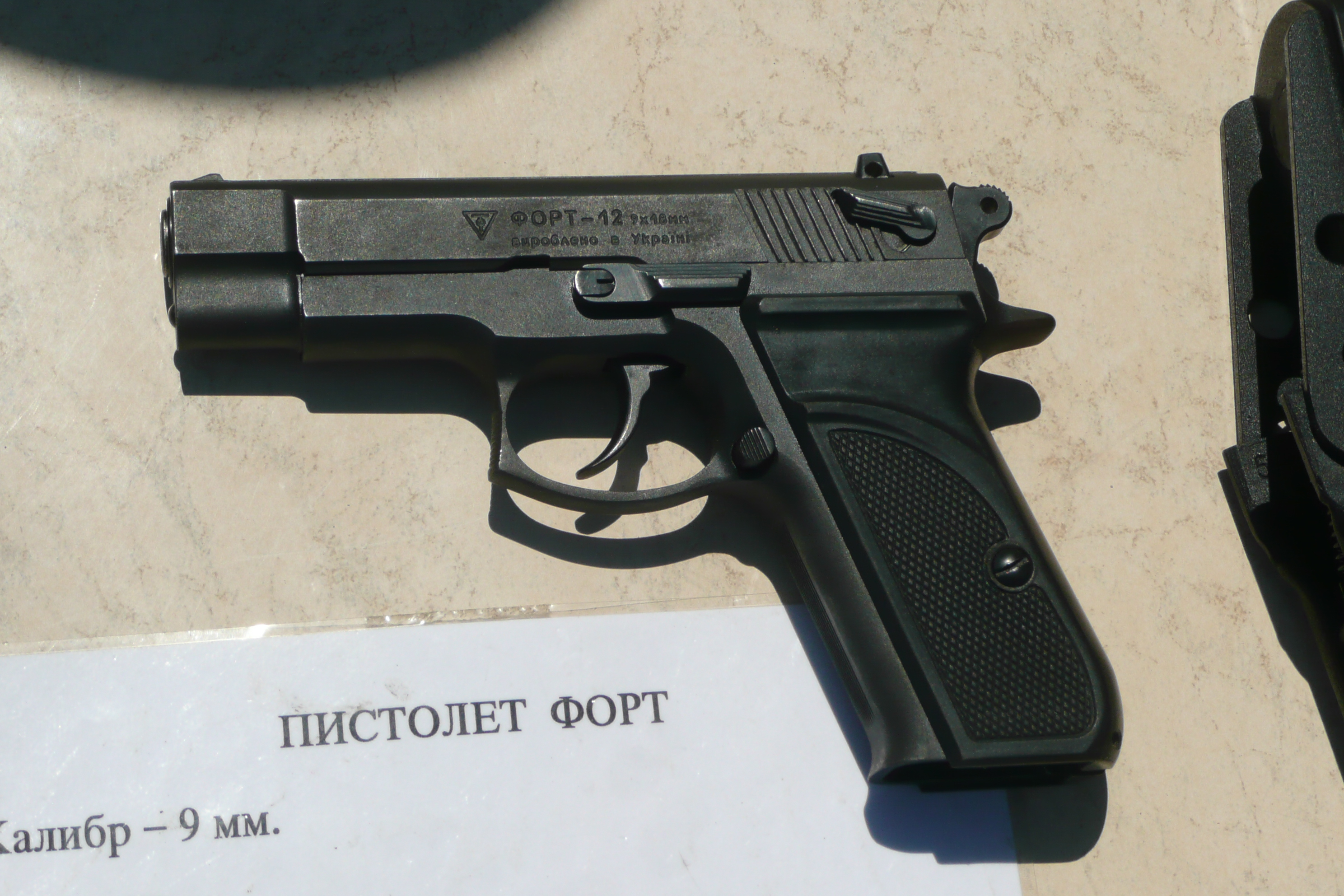
- Fort-12 pistol
- Type: Semi-automatic pistol
- Place of origin: Ukraine

Service history
- In service: 1998–present
- Wars: Russo-Ukrainian War

Production history
- Designer: Petro Zayets
- Designed: 1995 – June 1998
- Manufacturer: RPC Fort
- Produced: 1998–present

Specifications
- Mass: 830 g (empty); 950 g (loaded)
- Length: 180 mm
- Barrel length: 95 mm
- Width: 32 mm
- Height: 131 mm
- Cartridge: 9×18mm Makarov.380 ACP
- Action: Double-action, semi-automatic
- Rate of fire: 40 rounds per minute
- Muzzle velocity: 320 m/s
- Effective firing range: 50 meters
- Feed system: 12 (13), 24 round box magazine

The Fort-12 (Ukrainian: Форт-12) is a semi-automatic pistol which was designed in the late 1990s by Ukrainian firearms designer RPC Fort.

== History ==
The Fort-12 was produced to replace the Makarov pistols in Ukrainian service.

RPC Fort acquired machinery from the Česká Zbrojovka Uherský Brod and the first "Fort-12" pistols were made in 1995.

In December 1998, the "Fort-12" was adopted.

While early Fort-12 copies suffered from reliability issues, RFC Fort addressed those problems and improved the design.

== Design ==
The Fort-12 is chambered in the 9x18mm Makarov, former standard ammunition for the Soviet Union and Ukrainian Soviet Socialist Republic.

The Fort-12 is similar to the CZ-75, utilizes a simple blowback-operated action, double-action type trigger and manual safety lever on the left side.

=== Accessories ===
English	Ukrainian	Description	Reference
LT-6	ЛТ-6	Gun-mounted flashlight	
LT-6A	ЛТ-6А	Gun-mounted flashlight	
Fort-4	Форт-4	Detachable suppressor for Fort-12B	

RFC Fort also provides duty holster for uniformed security personnel.

== Variants ==
=== Fort-12 family ===
English	Ukrainian	Cartridge	Description	Reference
Fort-12	Форт-12	9×18mm Makarov	First model	
Fort-12-02	Форт-12-02	9×18mm Makarov	Limited edition (chromium-plated)	
Fort-12-03	Форт-12-03	9×18mm Makarov	Limited edition (nickel-plated)	
Fort-12B	Форт-12Б	9×18mm Makarov	Suppressed version (with detachable suppressor)	
Fort-12 CURZ	Форт-12 CURZ	9x17mm (.380 ACP)	Second model	
Fort-12N	Форт-12Н	9x17mm (.380 ACP)	An award of President of Ukraine and state award of Ukraine (since 2000), manufactured in presentational grade (with silvered frame, gold inlays and engravings)	
Sokol	Сокол	9×18mm Makarov	IPSC sport pistol with recoil compensator	
Fort-12G	Форт-12Г	9mm P.A. cartridge	Non-lethal gas pistol	
Fort-12R	Форт-12Р	9mm P.A. cartridge	Non-lethal gas pistol with the ability to fire ammunition with rubber bullets; 12 or 13 round box magazine	
Fort-12RM	Форт-12РМ	9mm P.A. cartridge	Non-lethal gas pistol with the ability to fire ammunition with rubber bullets; 13 round box magazine	
Fort-12T	Форт-12Т	9mm P.A. cartridge	Non-lethal gas pistol with the ability to fire ammunition with rubber bullets; 12 or 13 round box magazine	
Fort-12TM	Форт-12ТМ	9mm P.A. cartridge	Non-lethal gas pistol with the ability to fire ammunition with rubber bullets; 10 round box magazine	

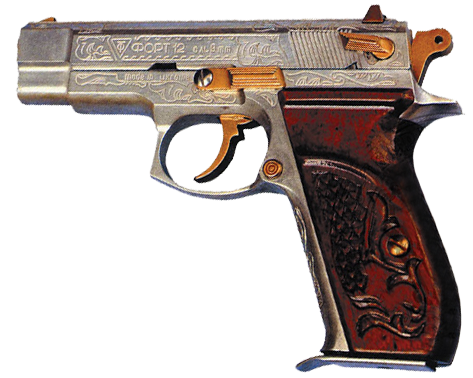
Fort-12N variant

=== Fort-14 ===
Designed for the Ukrainian law enforcement, the Fort-14 has a longer barrel and larger magazine than the Fort-12.

== Users ==
- Kazakhstan (Note: Fort-12T, Fort-12TM, Fort-12R are Fort-12RM are allowed for private security guards)
- Ukraine
  - Ukrainian Customs
  - Ministry of Internal Affairs
  - Private security guards
  - Security Service of Ukraine
  - National Police of Ukraine
  - State Border Guard Service of Ukraine
- Uzbekistan (Note: An agreement was signed in October 2000 on the delivery of a batch of Fort-12 pistols to Uzbekistan)

=== Former users ===
- Ukraine
  - Berkut
  - Grifon
  - Main Department of Internal Affairs of the city of Kyiv
- Russian Federation (Note: From 2008 to 2011, Fort-12Ts were sold on civilian market as non-lethal self-defence weapon. Since August 2014, Ukraine have banned the export of arms and military products to Russia, which includes magazines and other spare parts for previously sold pistols.)

=== Fort-12N recipients ===
Country	Date	Individual	References
Uzbekistan	February 1998	Islam Karimov	
Georgia	November 2006	Mikheil Saakashvili	
Georgia	November 2006	Vano Merabishvili	
Belarus	April 2009	S. S. Sidorsky	
Poland	September 2010	Bronisław Komorowski	
Kuwait	March 2018	Jaber Al-Mubarak Al-Hamad Al-Sabah	

== Gallery ==
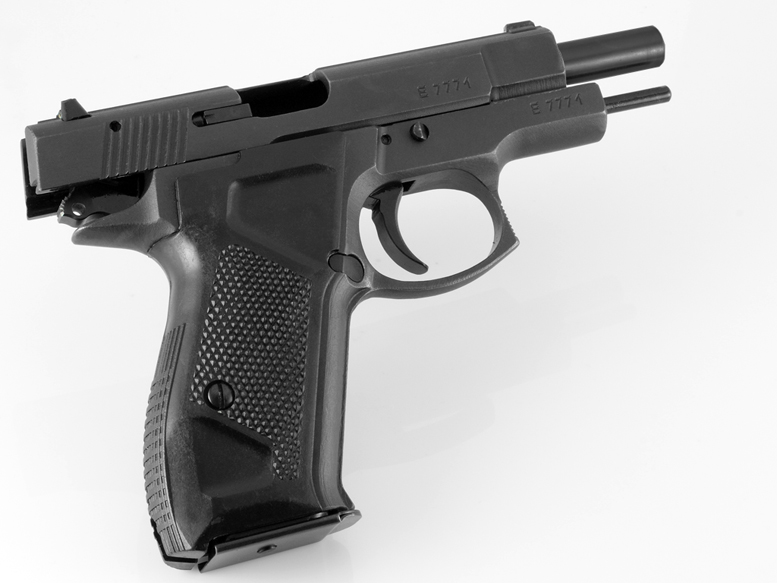
Fort-12

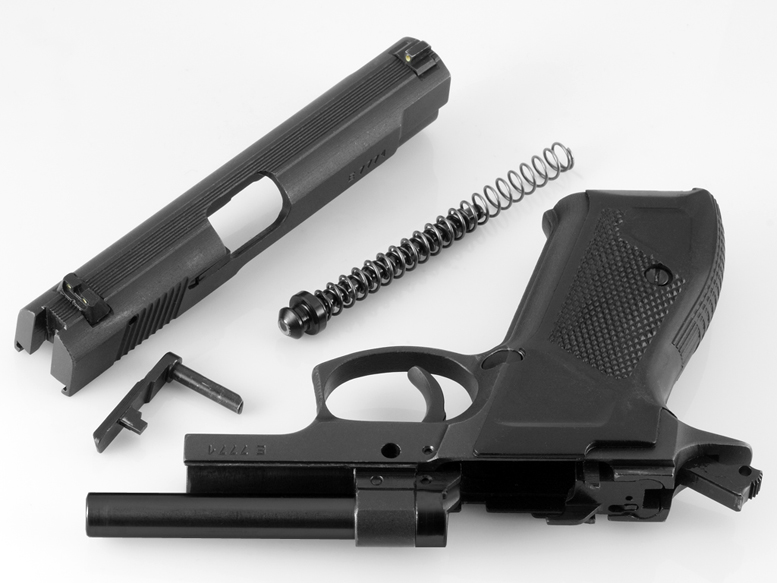
Fort-12 disassembled

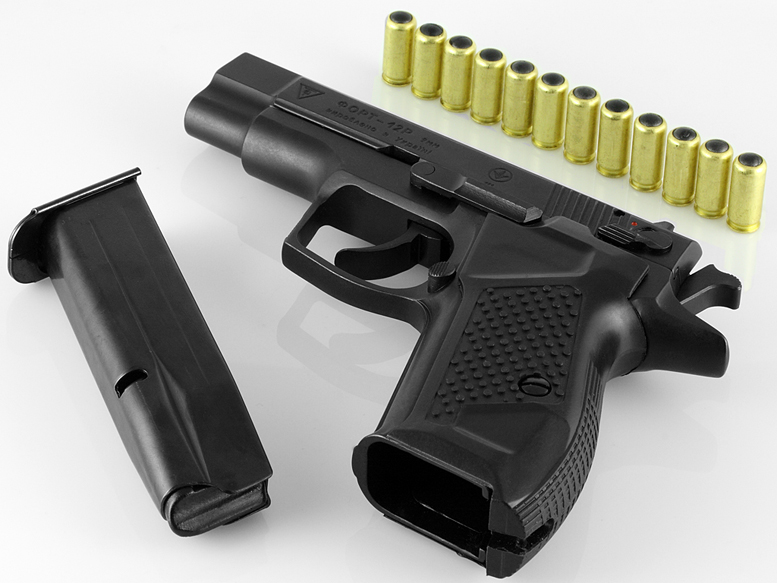
Fort-12R

== See also ==
- Fort-17
- RPC Fort

== Literature ==
- Макет масо-габаритного пістолета Форт-12: керівництво з експлуатації. – Вінниця: КНВО "Форт" МВС України, 2007. – 10 с.
