= Shevchenkove Raion =

Former subdivision of Kharkiv Oblast, Ukraine

Shevchenkove Raion Шевченківський район
- Raion
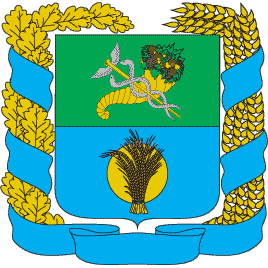
- Flag Coat of arms

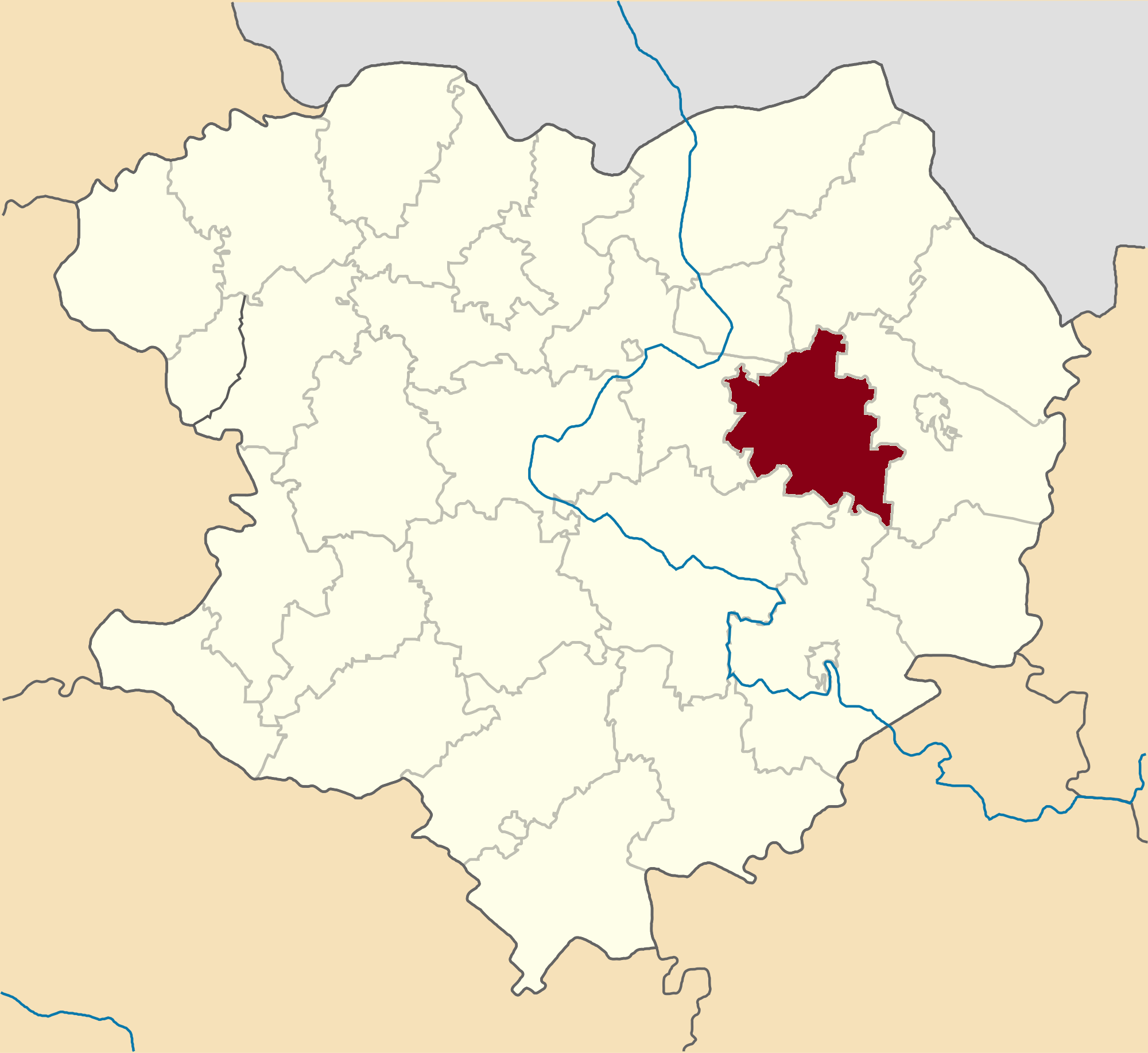
- Raion location in Kharkiv Oblast
- Coordinates: 49°40′54.5262″N 37°14′59.5134″E
- Country: Ukraine
- Oblast: Kharkiv Oblast
- Disestablished: 18 July 2020
- Admin. center: Shevchenkove

Area
  - Total: 977 km^{2} (377 sq mi)

Population (2020)
  - Total: 19,694
  - Density: 20.2/km^{2} (52.2/sq mi)
- Time zone: UTC+2 (EET)
  - Summer (DST): UTC+3 (EEST)
- Website: http://shevchenkovo.com.ua/

Shevchenkove Raion (Ukrainian: Шевченківський район) was a raion (district) in Kharkiv Oblast of Ukraine. Its administrative center was the urban-type settlement of Shevchenkove. The raion was abolished on 18 July 2020 as part of the administrative reform of Ukraine, which reduced the number of raions of Kharkiv Oblast to seven. The area of Shevchenkove Raion was merged into Kupiansk Raion. The last estimate of the raion population was 19,694 (2020 est.)

At the time of disestablishment, the raion consisted of one hromada, Shevchenkove settlement hromada with the administration in Shevchenkove.
