= Verbove, Zakarpattia Oblast =

Verbove Вербове Csonkás
- Village
- Interactive map of Verbove
- Location in Zakarpattia Oblast Location in Ukraine
- Coordinates: 48°07′08″N 22°54′47″E
- Country: Ukraine
- Oblast: Zakarpattia Oblast
- Raion: Berehove Raion
- Hromada: Vylok rural hromada
- Elevation: 121 m (397 ft)

Population (1989)
  - Total: 22
- Time zone: UTC+2 (EET)
  - Summer (DST): UTC+3 (EEST)
- Postal code: 90325
- Area code: +380 3143
- KOATUU: 2121282503

Verbove (Ukrainian: Вербо́ве; Hungarian: Csonkás) is a village in Berehove Raion, Zakarpattia Oblast, western Ukraine.

According to the 1989 Soviet census, the village had a population of 22 of whom 11 were men and 11 were women.
