= Verbove, Zaporizhzhia Raion, Zaporizhzhia Oblast =

Coordinates: 48°03′53″N 35°19′10″E

Verbove (Ukrainian: Вербо́ве) is a village in southern Ukraine, located in Zaporizhzhia Raion, Zaporizhzhia Oblast. It had a population of 316 as of 2026.

== History ==
On 19 May 2016, it was renamed from its former name Zhovtneve to Verbove in accordance with decommunization laws in Ukraine.
