= Hrushivka, Crimea =

Hrushivka Грушівка
- Village
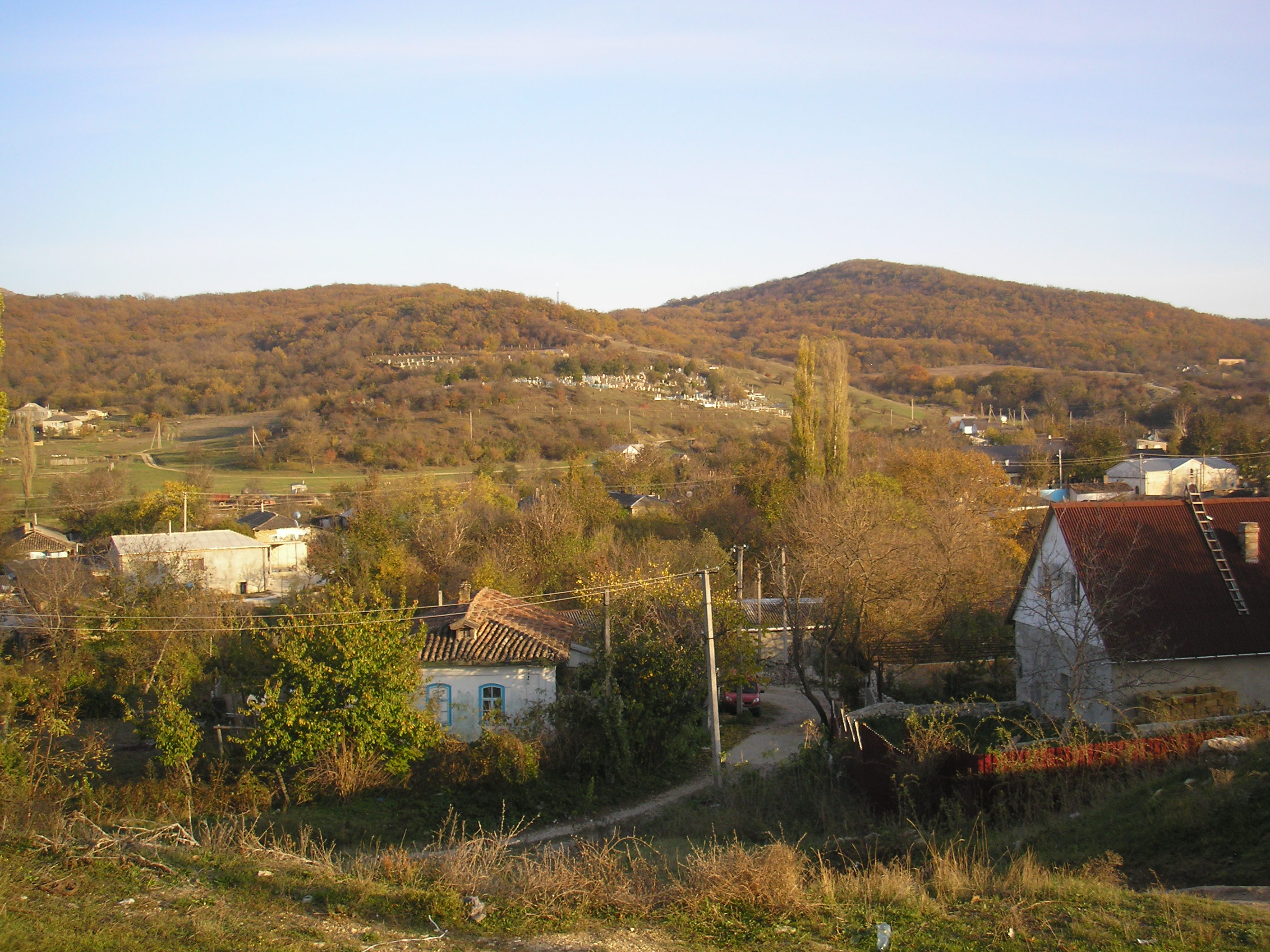
- View of Hrushivka with the Crimean Mountains in the background.

- Location of Hrushivka in Crimea
- Coordinates: 45°01′06″N 34°58′20″E
- Republic: Crimea
- Municipality: Sudak Municipality
- First mentioned: 1778

Area
  - Total: 2.4 km^{2} (0.93 sq mi)
- Elevation: 244 m (801 ft)

Population (2014)
  - Total: 2,269
  - Density: 950/km^{2} (2,400/sq mi)
- Time zone: UTC+4 (MSK)
- Postal code: 98020
- Area code: +380 6566
- Website: http://rada.gov.ua/

Hrushivka or Grushevka (Ukrainian: Грушівка; Russian: Грушевка) is a village in the Sudak Municipality of the Crimea, a territory recognized by a majority of countries as part of Ukraine and annexed by Russia as the Republic of Crimea.

Previously, the settlement was known as the Suuk-Sala village (Crimean Tatar: Suvuq Sala). Following the forced deportation of the Crimean Tatars in 1944, the Presidium of the Supreme Soviet of the Russian SFSR published a decree on May 18, 1948 renaming the settlement along with many others throughout Crimea from their native Crimean Tatar names to their current variants.

Hrushivka is located on Crimea's southern shore at an elevation of 244 metres (801 ft). Its population was 2,054 in the 2001 Ukrainian census. Current population: 2,269 (2014 Census).
