= Hrushivka, Kharkiv Oblast =

Village in Kharkiv Oblast, Ukraine

Hrushivka Грушівка
- Village
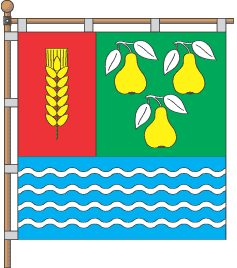
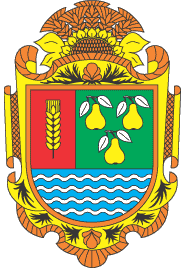
- Flag Coat of arms
- Interactive map of Hrushivka
- Location of Hrushivka in Kharkiv Oblast Hrushivka (Ukraine)
- Coordinates: 49.680556°N 37.464722°E
- Country: Ukraine
- Oblast: Kharkiv Oblast
- Raion: Kupiansk Raion
- Founded: 1815

Area
  - Total: 2.96 km^{2} (1.14 sq mi)
- Elevation: 111 m (364 ft)

Population (2001 census)
  - Total: 1,277
  - Density: 431/km^{2} (1,120/sq mi)
- Time zone: UTC+2 (EET)
  - Summer (DST): UTC+3 (EEST)
- Postal code: 63758
- Area code: +380 5742
- KOATUU: 6323781201
- KATOTTH: UA63080070090027381

Hrushivka (Ukrainian: Грушівка; Russian: Грушевка) is a village in Kupiansk Raion (district) in Kharkiv Oblast of eastern Ukraine, at about 95.5 kilometres (59.3 mi) southeast by south (SEbS) from the centre of Kharkiv city.

The settlement came under attack by Russian forces during the Russian invasion of Ukraine in 2022 and was regained by Ukrainian forces by the beginning of September the same year.
