= Sudak Municipality =

Sudak City Municipality Sudaq şeer şurası
- Municipality
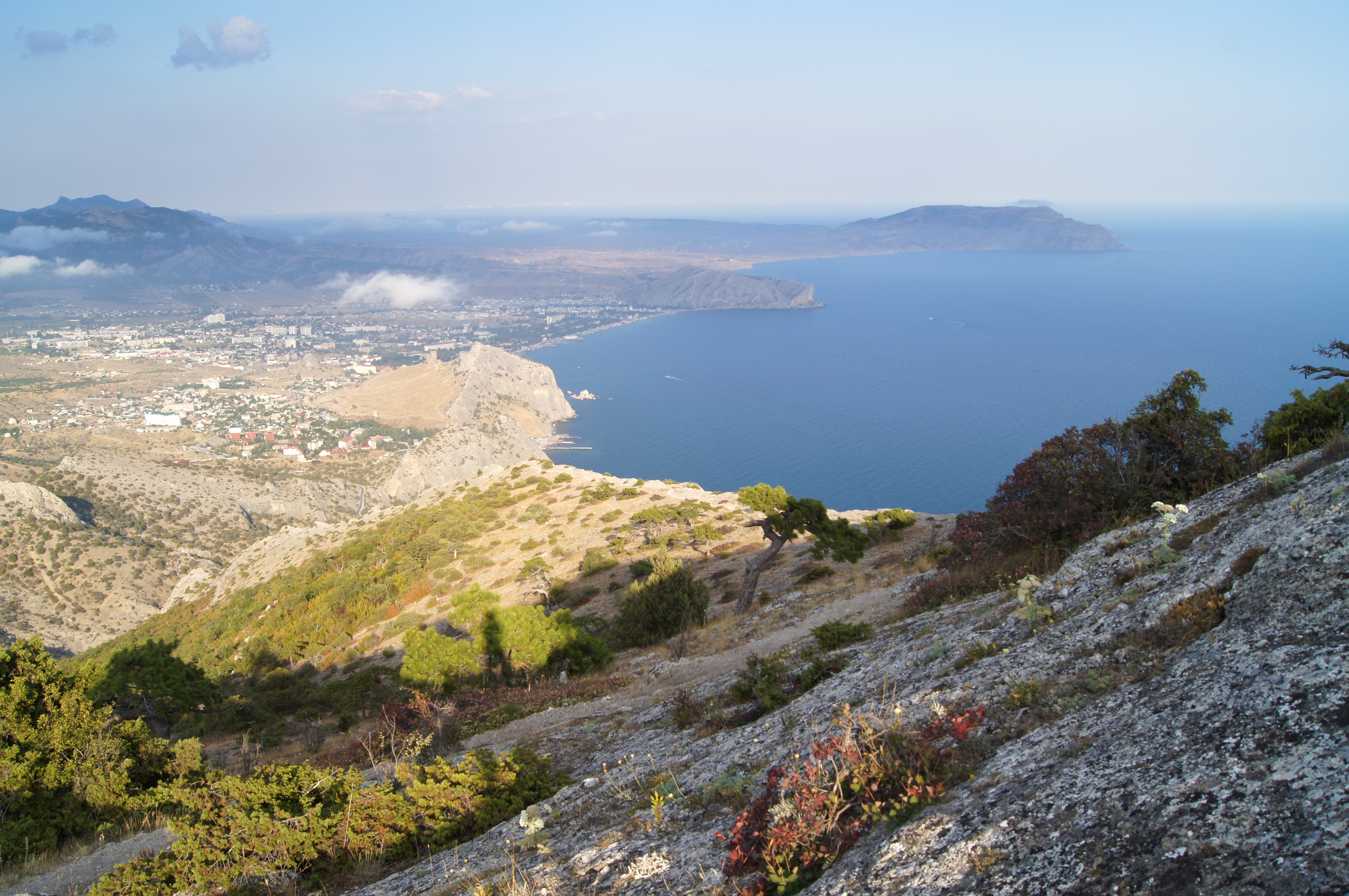

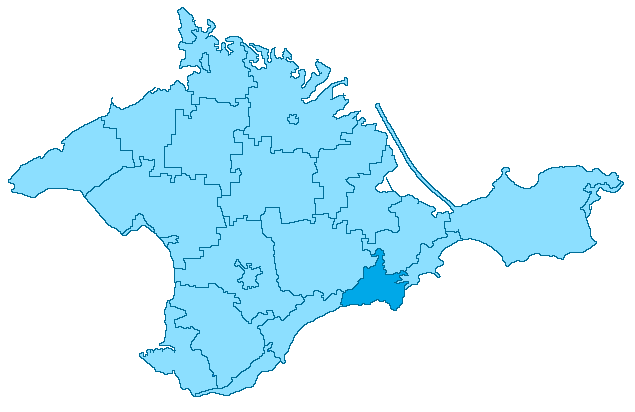
- Location within Crimea
- Coordinates: 44°51′5″N 34°58′21″E
- Country: Disputed: Ukraine (de jure); Russia (de facto)
- Republic: Crimea
- Capital: Sudak
- Subdivisions: List: 1 cities; 1 towns; 14 villages

Area
  - Total: 539 km^{2} (208 sq mi)

Population (2014)
  - Total: 32,278
  - Density: 59.9/km^{2} (155/sq mi)
- Time zone: UTC+3 (MSK)
- Dialing code: +7-36566 (de facto)
- Website: http://sudak.rk.gov.ru/ (de facto)

Sudak City Municipality (Ukrainian: Судацька міськрада, Russian: Судакский горсовет, Crimean Tatar: Sudaq şeer şurası), officially "the territory governed by the Sudak city council" is one of the 25 regions of the Crimean peninsula, currently subject to a territorial dispute between the Russian Federation and Ukraine. Population: 32,278 (2014 Census).

== Administrative divisions ==
Within the framework of administrative divisions of Russia, Sudak is, together with a number of urban and rural localities, incorporated separately as the town of republican significance of Sudak—an administrative unit with the status equal to that of the districts. As a municipal division, the town of republican significance of Sudak is incorporated as Sudak Urban Okrug.

Within the framework of administrative divisions of Ukraine, Sudak is incorporated as the town of republican significance of Sudak. Ukraine does not have municipal divisions.

Besides the city of Sudak the region includes the town of Novyi Svet and 14 villages which are organised into 7 communities.

Former Crimean Tatar names which were officially changed in 1945-49 and are now used only by the Crimean Tatar community are mentioned in brackets.

- Vesele village community
  - Vesele (Qutlaq)
- Hrushivka village community
  - Hrushivka (Suvuq Sala)
  - Perevalivka (El Buzlu)
  - Kholodivka (Osmançıq)
- Dachne village community
  - Dachne (Taraq Taş)
  - Lisne (Suvuq Suv)
- Mizhrichchya village community
  - Mizhrichchya (Ay Serez)
  - Voron
- Morske village community
  - Morske (Qapsihor)
  - Hromivka (Şelen)
- Novyi Svit town community
  - Novyi Svit
- Sonyachna Dolyna village community
  - Sonyachna Dolyna (Qoz)
  - Bahativka (Toqluq)
  - Myndalne (Arqa Deresi)
  - Pryberezhne (Kefessiya)

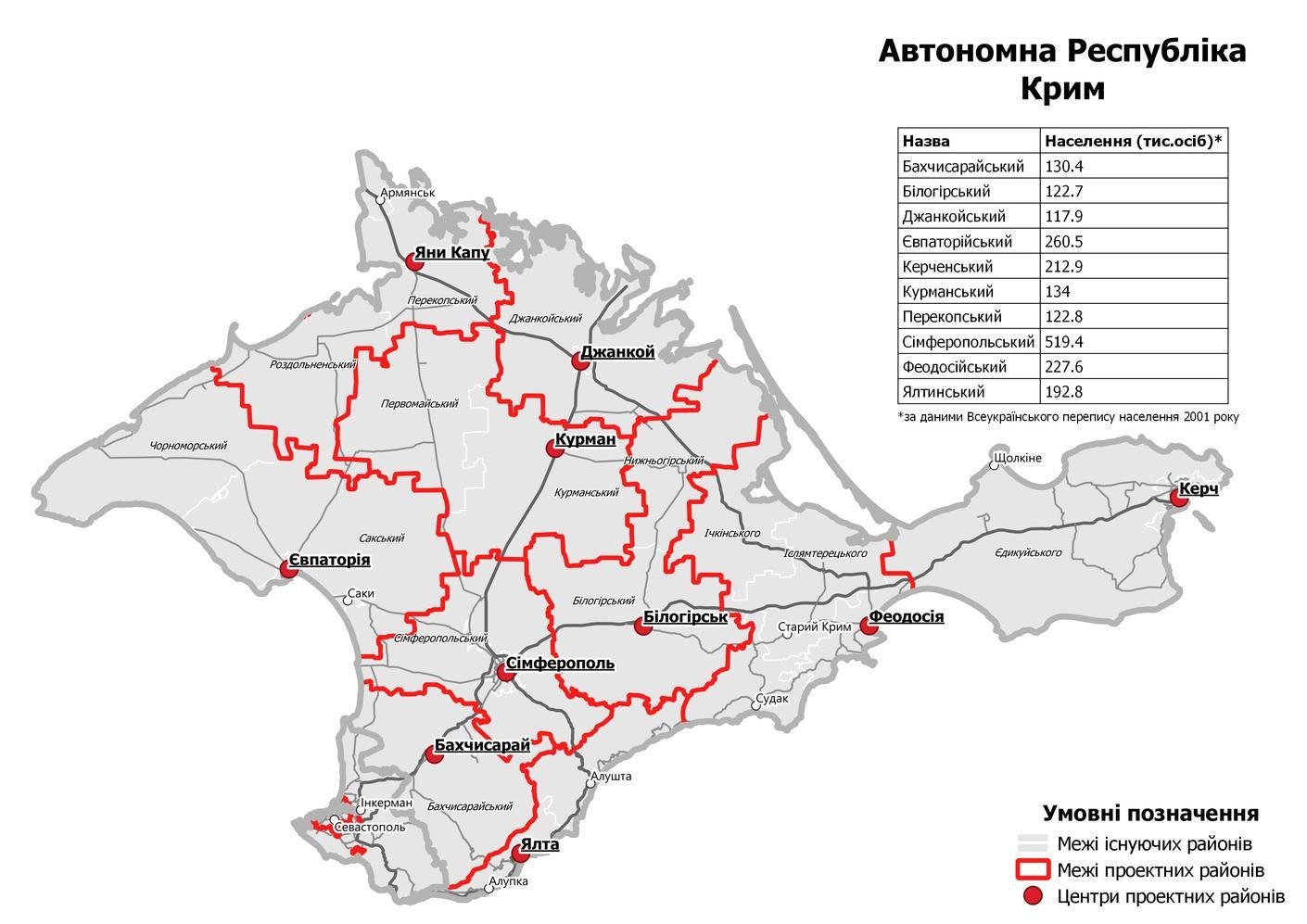
In July 2020, the Verkhovna Rada approved an administrative reform in Crimea

== 2020 Ukrainian Administrative Reform ==
In July 2020, Ukraine conducted an administrative reform throughout its de jure territory. This included Crimea, which was at the time occupied by Russia, and is still ongoing as of October 2023. Crimea was reorganized from 14 raions and 11 municipalities into 10 raions, with municipalities abolished altogether.

Sudak Municipality was abolished, and its territories to become a part of Feodosia Raion, but this has not yet been implemented due to the ongoing Russian occupation.
