= Ipsita Biswas =

Indian terminal ballistics scientist

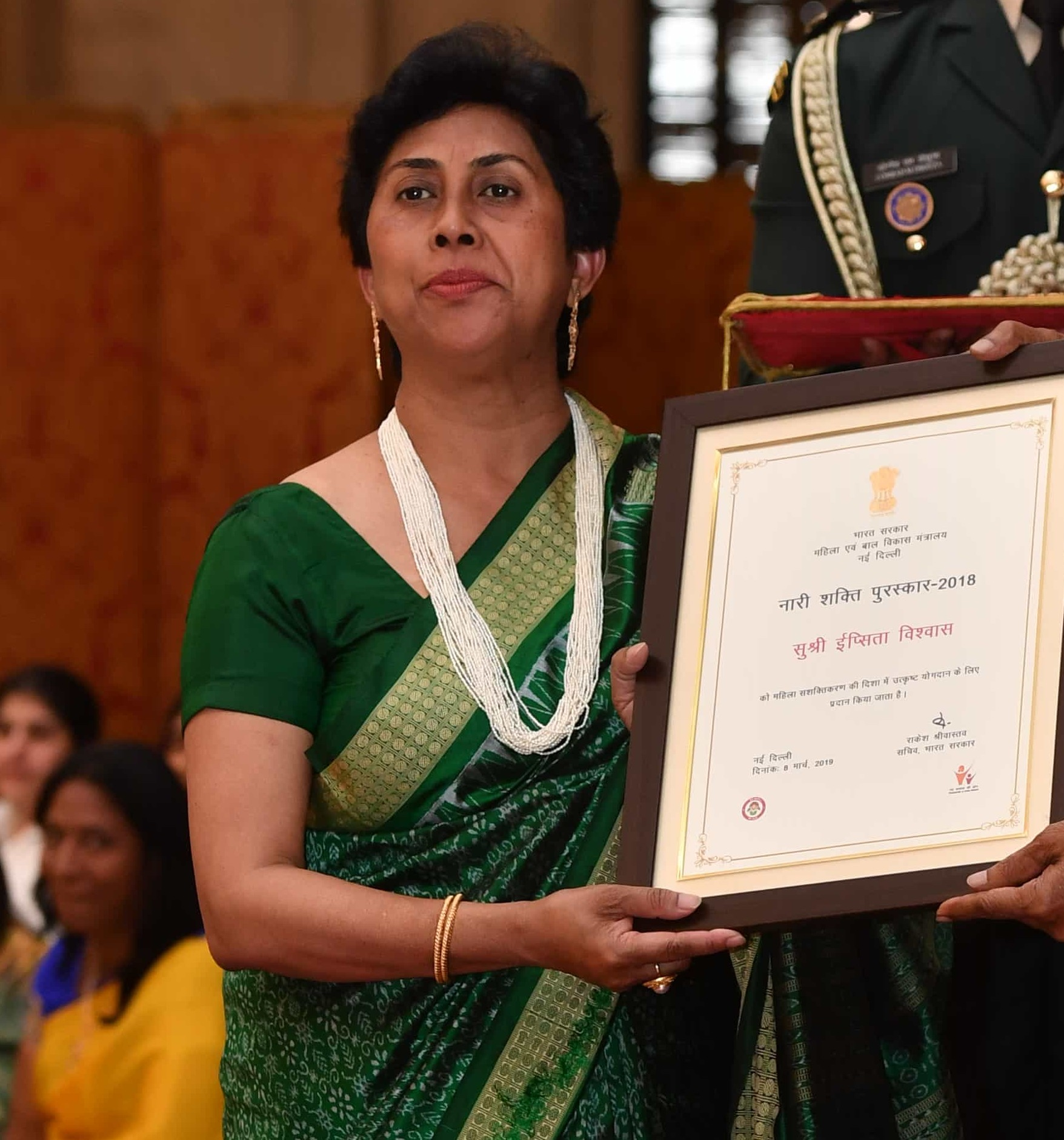
- Receiving the Narishakti Puruskar
- Occupation: Terminal ballistics scientist
- Employer(s): Terminal Ballistics Research Laboratory (TRBL), Defence Research and Development Organisation (DRDO), Government of India
- Known for: Contributions to India's armed forces, paramilitary forces and women's empowerment in defence research and development.

Ipsita Biswas is an Indian terminal ballistics scientist. In 2019 she was conferred India's highest civilian award for women, the Nari Shakti Puraskar, for her contributions to India's armed forces, paramilitary forces and women's empowerment in defence research and development.

== Life ==
Biswas was born and brought up in Kolkata. She completed her post-graduate degree in applied mathematics from Jadavpur University in 1988. Immediately after her post-graduation she applied for a job at the Defence Research and Development Organisation (DRDO) and was selected in 1988 itself. She joined Terminal Ballistics Research Laboratory (TBRL), a DRDO lab in 1998 and now leads three divisions in the laboratory.

Her work includes evaluating life-saving devices, protective systems and frangible bullets. In 2016, she led the TBRL team which developed less-lethal plastic bullets which have been used by Indian paramilitary forces for crowd control in Jammu and Kashmir. These plastic bullets can be used in the existing weapons used by the security forces.

In March 2019, she was conferred India's highest civilian award for women, the Narishakti Puruskar "2018", by President Ram Nath Kovind, for her contributions to the women's empowerment in defence R&D and for her work on bulletproof vests and other protective systems for India's security forces. The award was conferred at the Presidential Palace. Prime Minister Narendra Modi was present. She has also been conferred the 'Agni Award for Excellence in Self Reliance' and the 'High Energy Material Society of India (HEMSI) Team Award for Meritorious Service'. The bullets can be used in AK-47 rifles and they "reduce fatalities".

Biswas and her team have also been involved with developing frangible bullets which shatter if they hit a surface that is harder than the bullet. The application would allow sky marshals to use these bullets to shoot, or threaten to shoot, hijackers on board aircraft with the assurance that the aircraft itself would not suffer substantial damage. Air India have been using sky marshals since 1999.
