= Stone pelting in Kashmir =

Protest tactics in Kashmir

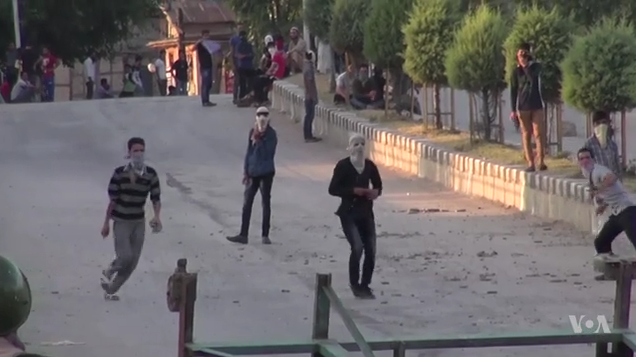
Kashmiri youth throwing stones at Indian armed forces during 2016–2017 Kashmir unrest.

Stone pelting in Kashmir referred to stone throwing by Kashmiris on the Indian forces and Jammu and Kashmir Police deployed for crowd control in Jammu and Kashmir to support the separatist insurgents. In the local language, it was known as Kanni Jung, which means "fighting with stones", and the stone pelters were known as Sangbaaz or Pathraw Player.

However, after abrogation of Article 370 the number of stone pelting incidents dropped significantly.

== Background and history ==
In the past, stones were pelted by the Kashmiri Muslim youth on the police in the streets of Srinagar for expressing their anger during 1931 Kashmir agitation. After the rise of insurgency and separatist movement in Kashmir conflict, the stone pelting incidents became prominent in Kashmir from the 2008 Kashmir protests in which the separatist movement had taken a new dimension from gun-fighting with armed forces to the pelting of stones on them. After the year 2008, stone pelting incidents in the valley were reported on a regular basis; the prominent among them were recorded in 2010 Kashmir Unrest and 2016-17 Kashmir Unrest, but minor skirmishes were also reported in those intermediate years.

The act of stoning (rajm) is mentioned in multiple Hadiths. However some factions within Islam disagree with the legality of rajm. In Pakistan, military dictator General Muhammad Zia-ul-Haq who implemented Sharia law reconstituted a court, which declared rajm as Islamic.

== A form of resistance ==
Many separatist leaders say that stone pelting is a form of resistance used by Kashmiri people to challenge Indian administration.

MC Kash, a Kashmiri rapper, writes in his song "I Protest",

"I protest, For a mother who lost her son. I protest, I'll throw stones and never run".

== Commentary ==
According to scholar Waheeda Khan, most of the 'stone-pelters' are school and college going students. The stone-pelters, in turn get attacked by the armed personnel with pellets, rubber bullets, sling shots and tear gas shells. This leads to eye-injuries and several other kind of injuries to many people. Security forces also face injuries, and sometimes get beaten up during these events. According to political activist Mannan Bukhari, Kashmiris made stone, an easily accessible and defenseless weapon, their weapon of choice for protest. Incidents have been there where Kashmiri youth was hired during protests for stone pelting.

Kashmiri senior journalist Parvaiz Bukhari remarked:

The summer of 2010 witnessed a convulsion in the world's most militarized zone, the Indian-controlled part of Kashmir, an unprecedented and deadly civil unrest that is beginning to change a few things on the ground. [...] Little known and relatively anonymous resistance activists emerged, organizing an unarmed agitation more fierce than the armed rebellion against Indian rule two decades earlier. And apparently aware of the post 9/11 world, young Kashmiris, children of the conflict, made stones and rocks a weapon of choice against government armed forces, side-stepping the tag of a terrorist movement linked with Pakistan. The unrest represents a conscious transition to an unarmed mass movement, one that poses a moral challenge to New Delhi's military domination over the region.

Journalist Malini Parthasarathy says that stone pelting is driven by the brutal killings of Kashmiri youth at the hands of Indian forces.

On 28 April 2017, talking about the stone pelters in Kashmir, the Indian Army Chief Bipin Rawat has said, "In fact, I wish these people, instead of throwing stones at us, were firing weapons at us. Then I would have been happy. Then I could do what I (want to do)," referring to the 'dirty' nature of the proxy war and the need to protect electoral apparatus, and stating his perception post the human shield controversy

The Special Director General (SDGP) of Central Reserve Police Force (CRPF) N K Tripathi stated that since the militancy related activities have declined in the region,

"a new form of gunless terrorism in the shape of stone-pelting has emerged in Kashmir", "It is being funded by Pakistan and its agencies through Over Ground Workers (sympathizers of militants) and hawala channels" with an objective to disturb the peace in Kashmir and India. He added that "There are a large number of instances of unprovoked stone-pelting by hostile mobs on CRPF that has left 1500 jawans injured and close to 400 vehicles damaged in the last one-and-a-half year" (2009-10).

=== Reports ===
During the 2016–17 Kashmir unrest, in March 2017, India Today, after conducting an investigative operation in the Kashmir Valley, reported that stone-pelters are paid for protesting by separatist forces. India Today interviewed five protesters from Baramulla district, who confessed on camera that they are paid an amount of Rs. 5,000-Rs 7,000 a month and are also provided with clothes and shoes. One of them also said that separate funds are given for making petrol bombs. They refused to disclose the identity of the financiers.

In April 2017, a report by India's Intelligence Bureau (IB) had stated that the Pakistan's intelligence agency, Inter-Services Intelligence (ISI) supplied ₹800 crore to Kashmiri separatist leaders including Syed Ali Shah Geelani and Asiya Andrabi to fuel unrest in the Valley. As per the report, the funds supplied by the ISI were used to pay off stone-pelters and petrol bomb throwers, and also to propagate anti-India and anti-security forces sentiments in the Valley.

== Incidents ==
In 2009 separatists and political party workers were believed to be behind stone-throwing incidents, which led to retaliatory fire from the police. An auto rickshaw laden with stones meant for distribution was seized by the police in March 2009.

In 2016, Kashmir witnessed 2690 stone pelting incidents in various districts with Baramulla topping the list with 492 incidents followed by Srinagar and Kupwara each with 339 incidents. The least recorded incidents were 65 in Ganderbal. According to official data of state home department, North Kashmir saw the highest number of 1,248 incidents followed by 875 incidents in South Kashmir and 567 in Central Kashmir.

On 7 September 2018, Jammu and Kashmir plainclothes policemen disguised themselves as stone-pelters and mingled among a stone pelting mob in Srinagar, resulting in the successful arrests of repeat stone-pelting offenders. The policemen threw stones as well as used toy guns as part of the disguise. This strategy had previously been used by the police in the region during the 2010 unrest in Kashmir.

On 25 October 2018, an Indian Army soldier was killed after sustaining head injuries in a stone pelting incident in Anantnag district of South Kashmir. The Indian soldier was identified to be Rajendra Singh, a 22 year old from Uttarakhand. An army spokesperson said that Sepoy Rajendra Singh was part of a "Quick Reaction Team" that was providing security to a Border Roads Organisation (BRO) convoy. Following the event Army Chief General Bipin Rawat said that stone pelters are like terrorists and must be dealt with sternly, repeating his earlier stand that the stone-pelters are nothing but over ground workers of terror outfits, "I still say the same... If they (stone-pelters) can kill people with such acts, are they not becoming like terrorists".

=== Sangbaaz Association posters ===
In July 2016, posters attributed to a group of stone-pelters, calling themselves as "Sangbaaz Association Jammu and Kashmir, Azad Kashmir", were seen in Srinagar. The posters listed various points, including threatening to burn girls alive for riding scooters. The text read as – "we request all girls please don't use of scooty if we saw any girl who ride scooty we will burn the scooty as well as the girl". Kashmiri media blackened out the report of the threats, but it was carried by media agencies and houses such as Press Trust of India, The Indian Express and The Quint. Reacting to the blackout, Shujaat Bukhari, Editor-in-Chief of Rising Kashmir stated, "The issue is that you don't know who is putting up these posters... There is no authenticity."

== See also ==
- Palestinian stone-throwing
