= Indian Armed Forces in Jammu and Kashmir =

Overview of the Indian military presence in Jammu and Kashmir

Indian Armed Forces in Jammu and Kashmir encompass the Indian Army, Navy and Air Force, tri-service units such as the Armed Forces Special Operations Division (AFSOD), and paramilitary organisations of the Central Armed Police Forces such as the Border Security Force, the Central Reserve Police Force, the Sashastra Seema Bal and the Indo-Tibetan Border Police. Each three wings of India's military have their special forces deployed in the region including Indian Army's Para SF, the Indian Navy MARCOS and the Indian Air Force's Garud Commando Force. Apart from this, there is the elite police anti-insurgency force in the region, the Special Operations Group, of the Jammu and Kashmir Police.

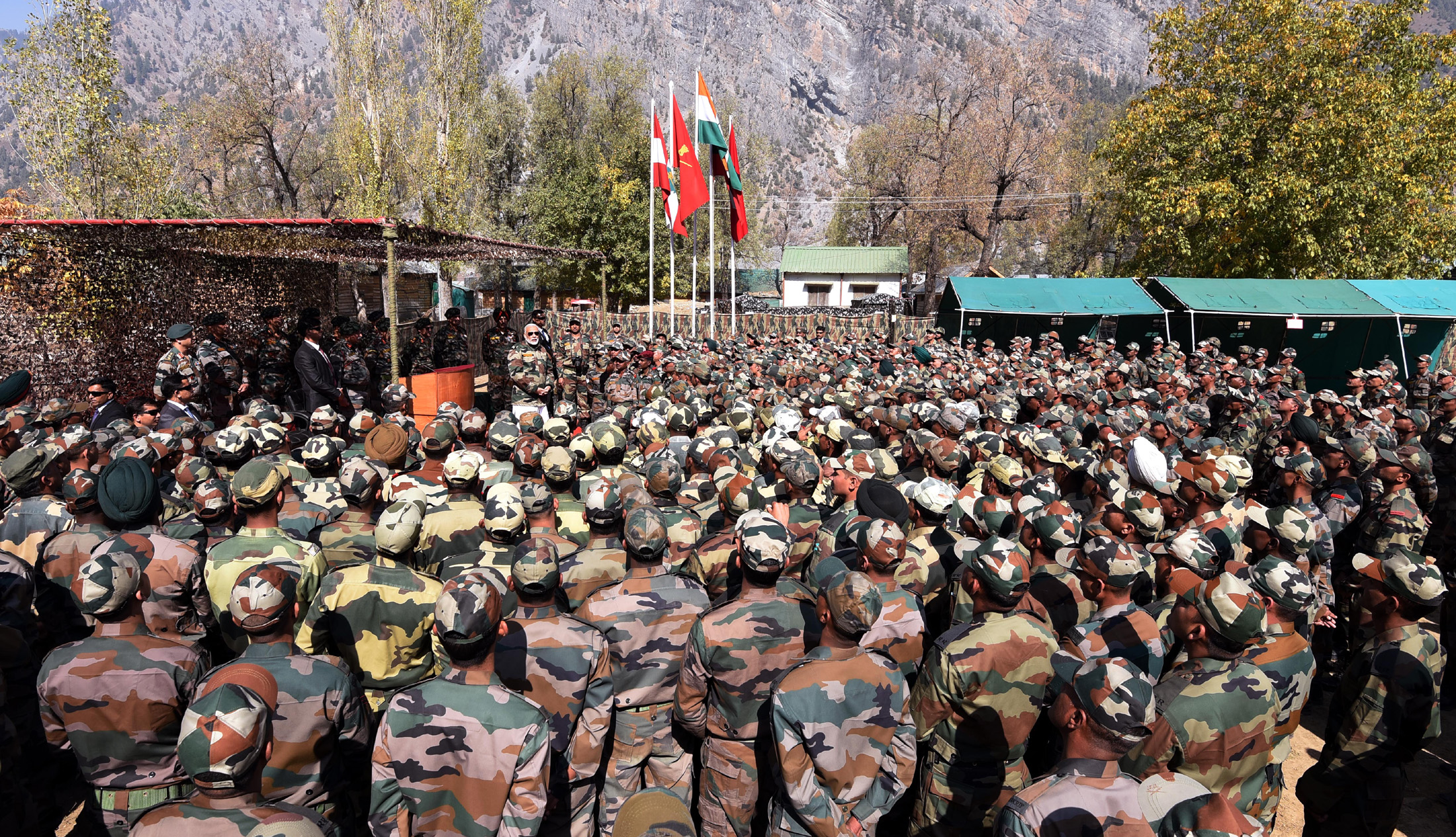
Prime Minister Modi celebrating Diwali with the jawans of Indian Army and BSF, in the Gurez Valley, near the Line of Control, in Jammu and Kashmir, on October 19, 2017.

== Indian Army ==
The Indian Army was first deployed in Kashmir during the Indo-Pakistani War of 1947–1948. Following this the Army has been a part of every conflict, standoff and border skirmish with Pakistan and China in the region. Internal security deployments in the region include anti-terror operations and counter-insurgency operations. Most anti-terror operations in the region are led by the Army, with the CRPF and SOG providing perimeter and crowd control support.

== Indian Air Force ==
In 1947, the Royal Indian Air Force, C-47 Dakotas and Tempests, provided transport and air support to the Indian army, allowing Indian troops to re-gain control over large areas of the former princely state of Jammu and Kashmir. Following this, the Air Force has provided support in Jammu and Kashmir on numerous occasions, including humanitarian missions such as during the Jammu and Kashmir floods, 2014. The Air Force started attaching the Garuds with the army in Jammu and Kashmir to give them "live situation training". The commandos are attached to the Chinar Corps and Rashtriya Rifles of the army.

== Indian Navy ==
The MARCOS work side by side with the Army in Jammu and Kashmir, with one of their key roles being to ensure the security of Wular Lake. From 2018 onwards, the MARCOS were deployed in the region as part of Armed Forces Special Operations Division.

== Central Armed Police Forces ==
=== Border Security Force ===
The BSF is responsible for ensuring security along the international border with Pakistan and Bangladesh.

=== Central Reserve Police Force ===
26 battalions of CRPF are posted in the Kashmir region, with operations being conducted in the area between "Kupwara in North to Jawahar Tunnel in South and Pahalgam in East to Shopian in West". In 2020 the CRPF got new bulletproof jackets and armored troop carriers.

Other CAPF (Central Armed police force) are also deployed in Kashmir region.

== Special Operations Group ==
The Jammu and Kashmir Police Special Operations Group (SOG) was created in the early 1990s. Each district of Kashmir has multiple SOG units with varying strength according to the amount of militancy in the district. Each unit is headed by a deputy superintendent of police. Kulgam, Anantnag, Shopian and Pulwama are districts with the most SOG units.

== Casualties ==
In 2020, in April and May, there have been 27 casualties from the Army, CRPF, police and BSF across Kashmir valley.

== Bibliography ==
- Barua, Pradeep (2005). The State at War in South Asia. University of Nebraska Press. p. 192. ISBN 978-0-8032-1344-9.
