= Crowd control in Jammu and Kashmir =

Methods employed by Indian forces to manage riots and protests in Kashmir

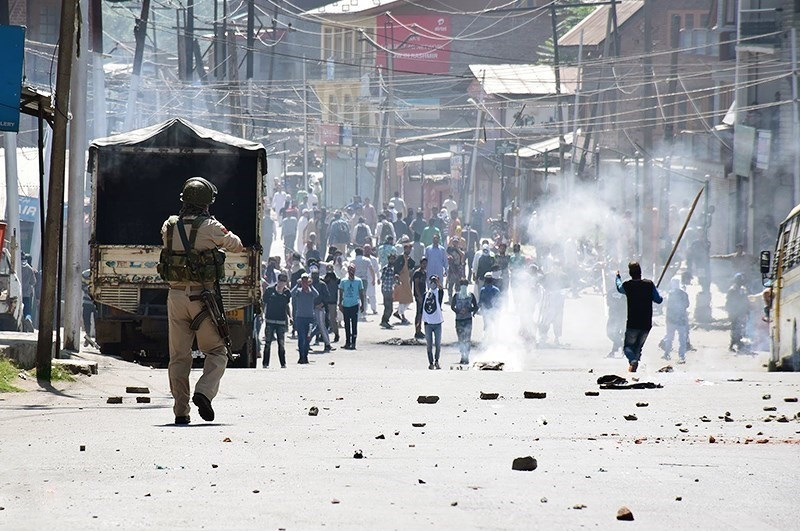
Police in Kashmir confronting violent protesters in December 2018

Crowd control in Jammu and Kashmir is a public security practice to prevent and manage violent riots. It is enforced by police forces through laws preventing unlawful assembly, as well as using riot control agents such as tear gas, chili grenades, and pellet guns (riot shotguns that fire pellet cartridges).

In 2010, India instituted the use of pellet guns to control protestors violently clashing with the police. The use of pellet cartridges was criticized by several NGOs due to the grievous and lethal injuries they cause. The government in 2016 formed a committee to look into alternative riot control agents. The army recommended to the committee that non-lethal weapons – including pepper guns, long range acoustic devices, and chili grenades – replace pellet guns. Based on the committee's report, the use of these alternative riot control agents were initiated against violent crowds. However, the Minister of Home Affairs clarified in 2017, that "if these measures prove to be ineffective in dispersing of rioters, use of pellet guns may be resorted to". In a 2018 report, the Office of the United Nations High Commissioner for Human Rights called on both India and Pakistan to investigate the abuse of rights in the regions administered by them.

As a part of the graded response to violent protests, Indian police forces have used plastic bullets before pellet guns. The security forces have multiple options for enforcing crowd control such as tear smoke shells, PAVA shells, rubber bullets fired from gas guns, plastic bullets, and pellet guns before finally resorting to opening fire with live ammunition against stone pelting protestors during violent clashes.

== Background ==
India and Pakistan have fought three wars in Kashmir during 1947–1948, 1965 and the Kargil War in 1999. In 27 years, between 1990 and 2017, insurgency in Jammu and Kashmir claimed a total of 41,000 lives (14,000 civilians, 5,000 security personnel and 22,000 militants) according to government figures made available in 2017.

In February 2010, the Special Director General (SDGP) of Central Reserve Police Force (CRPF) N K Tripathi stated that since the militancy related activities have declined in the region, "a new form of gunless terrorism in the shape of stone-pelting has emerged in Kashmir", "It is being funded by Pakistan and its agencies through over ground workers (sympathizers of militants) and hawala channels" with an objective to disturb the peace in Kashmir and India. He added that "There are a large number of instances of unprovoked stone-pelting by hostile mobs on CRPF that has left 1500 jawans injured and close to 400 vehicles damaged in the last one-and-a-half year" (2009–10).

In June 2018, the Office of the United Nations High Commissioner for Human Rights issued the UN's first-ever report on human rights conditions in Kashmir. Because both Pakistan and India excluded UN investigators from their territories, the report was based on public domain information and research by local and international human rights groups. United Nations human rights officials through the report had asked both India and Pakistan to investigate the abuse of rights in the regions administered by them. The report asked for numerous human rights corrections on both sides, and asked Pakistan to stop misusing anti-terror legislation. India rejected the report, which asked for urgent repeal of the 1990 Armed Forces (Special Powers) Act under which its security forces have immunity. Pakistan refutes UN allegations that it supports Kashmiri militants.

Indian security forces have been criticized for using excessive force to control protests in Jammu and Kashmir. The Pakistani military has supported the militant groups Jaish-e-Mohammed and Lashkar-e-Taiba and have been seen by observers as the "main impediment to a final peace".

According to data accessed by The Times of India in 2016, Jammu and Kashmir saw at least a three-year peak in riots, totaling 2897 rioting incidents. According to Indian Police Service (IPS) officer, K. Durga Prasad, the director-general of the CRPF during 2016, there were 47 incidents of grenade attacks and 43 petrol or acid attacks on CRPF personnel in the region, as well as 142 incidents of stone pelting reported on CRPF camps. Rioting fell to 732 incidents in the valley in 2018, with 51 protesters being killed during clashes and 37 protesters being killed during encounters.

== Legal provisions ==
Orders banning mass gatherings are legally enacted through Section 144 of the Code of Criminal Procedure (Code of Criminal Procedure, 1989, the state act for Jammu and Kashmir, not the central Code of Criminal Procedure for India). Curfews are also enacted by district magistrates through Section 144. In 2016 Kashmir unrest after the killing of Burhan Wani, a curfew was enforced in the Kashmir valley. The curfew lasted for over 60 days, the longest in the history of Jammu and Kashmir. In 2016 and 2017, a total of 168 curfews and restrictions have been imposed in Jammu and Kashmir with Anantnag district seeing the most restrictions being imposed, a total of 51 times.

== Standard operating procedures ==
The Ministry of Home Affairs set up a task force in September 2010 to recommend standard operating procedures to provide guidelines for crowd and riot control. The Bureau of Police Research and Development (BPRD) in India laid out these guidelines in their report, "Standard Operating Procedures to deal with public agitations with non-lethal measures". The equipment listed includes tasers, dye grenades, stink bombs, water cannons, regular tear gas shells and plastic bullets for mob dispersal. Pellet guns were not part of the BPRD's list of "non-lethal" equipment under these standard operating procedures.

In August 2016, the director general of CRPF, IPS officer, R. R. Bhatnagar, had stated that a multi-step graded mechanism is followed by the CRPF for dealing with crowds. "The first weapon used to disperse the crowds, be it near an encounter site or anywhere else, is the tear smoke munitions. The next in the list are chili bombs, followed by pump action guns. Preventing collateral damage is our priority. We do not want civilians getting injured during counter-insurgency operations."

In 2017, following the 2016–17 Kashmir unrest, the Ministry of Home Affairs set up another expert panel to review usage of pellet guns and suggest replacements. The panel suggested recommendations based on the United Nations Peacekeeping Pre-deployment Training (PDT) Standards report of 2015. Plastic bullets were deployed following this, adding to the list of non-lethal alternatives for security forces in the region.

== Equipment ==
During the Kashmir Unrest from 8 July to 11 August 2016, when more than 1000 violent incidents occurred, the Central Reserve Police Force (CRPF) said they used fourteen types of "less lethal and non-lethal" equipment for controlling crowds, including oleoresin grenades and electric shells with a total of 8,650 tear-smoke shells and around 2,671 plastic pellets being used. In the same year, the CRPF used around 3000 pellet cartridges in 32 days during riots. Slingshots were also used, with stones or glass marbles being used as projectiles.

In mid-2018, the CRPF placed orders for non-lethal riot control equipment such as 300,000 rubber bullets and 200,000 tear gas shells as well as chili grenades and dye-marker grenades. In December 2018, the Jammu and Kashmir Police (JKP) invited bids from makers and dealers for procurement of new pepper-ball launching systems and anti-riot gas masks. The pepper-ball launching systems fire projectiles from 'forced compliance weapons', similar to paintball guns.

In 2018, over 500 female CRPF personnel have also been deployed to deal with female stone pelters among other things.

== Pellet guns ==
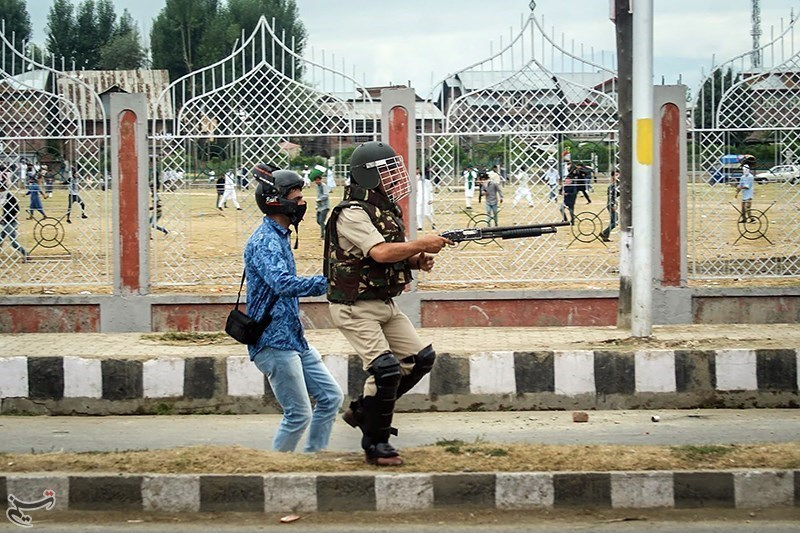
A policeman holding a pellet shotgun during a clash with violent protesters after Eid Prayers in Kashmir on 2017-09-02

Pellet guns are a form of pump-action riot shotguns that fire metal pellets, also called birdshot. Pellets are small metal pieces, round or irregular in shape. One pellet cartridge contains around 500 pellets. They are manufactured at the Ordinance Factory in Ichapore.

Pellet guns are used by Indian police forces (CRPF and the Jammu and Kashmir Police) as a less-lethal defensive crowd control measure against violent, stone pelting mobs in Jammu and Kashmir. These were introduced by the central government following the 2010 Kashmir unrest in which over 100 protesters were killed in police firing. Since July–August 2016, more than 1000 violent incidents took place in Jammu and Kashmir in which more than 3,329 security passengers and 5,000 protestors were injured. The Jammu and Kashmir police used pellet guns for the first time on crowds on 14 August 2010, when a mob of around 3000 people tried to overrun a Rashtriya Rifles base in Sopore.

In July 2016, protests began in Kashmir after senior separatist militant Burhan Wani was killed by the security forces. Violent mobs numbering thousands of local residents came out in the streets on a daily basis, attacking the security forces with stones. The mobs did not have an obvious leader and consisted mostly of young boys. Lack of a clear leader further complicated the crowd control measures. Reuters reported a senior police officer stating that the police were often forced to deploy non-lethal pellet guns at a close range in self defence from attacks by violent mobs.

=== Casualties ===
Since July 2016, thousands of people in Jammu and Kashmir have suffered pellet wounds, hundreds sustained eye injuries, and at least 14 people have died due to pellet injuries. At least 16 personnel from Jammu and Kashmir Police have also suffered pellet injuries. More than 570 patients with mutilated retinas or severed optic nerves entered SMHS Hospital in Srinagar after their eyes were hit with pellets. 27 protestors were struck by pellets in both eyes. Dr. Natarajan and his team came to help on the request of the Adhik Kadam who is a social worker working since 1997 in Jammu and Kashmir runs a local Non Profit organization Borderless World Foundation

One of the youngest pellet gun victims is a 19-month-old child, Heeba Jan, who suffered injuries in 2018 when she and her mother were caught in the middle of a violent clash while escaping from tear gas near their house. Local residents had attempted to interrupt an ongoing gunfight between armed militants inside a house and police forces, and when the police tried to stop the residents, a violent clash ensued and tear gas and pellet guns were deployed. Another young victim, 15-year-old Insha Malik (Insha Ahmed), sustained eye injuries observing protests from her house in Shopian.

=== Response ===
Pellet guns have been criticised for the injuries they cause especially when the pellets hit the eyes of protesters causing partial blindness. Hospitals are overwhelmed with treating the victims during the periods of intense protests. According to the president of Doctors Association Kashmir:

The pellet guns have been a horrific nightmare. Calling the pellet gun non-lethal is a dangerous fallacy. Even after the surgeries, we cannot remove all the pellets from the bodies. They are like ticking time bombs inside a person.

Protests have been held to ban or replace pellet guns with less harmful ammunitions.

According to Amnesty International India, pellet guns are not officially in use anywhere else in India. In July 2016, Amnesty International asked the government to ban the usage of pellet guns and seek less harmful devices. The United Nations Commission on Human Rights called the pellet guns "one of most dangerous weapons used against protesters". In August 2016, Kashmiri doctors and medical workers wore a white gauze patch over one eye to protest the use of pellet guns and a recent killing in Srinagar.

Responding to a public interest litigation in the Jammu and Kashmir High Court the CRPF stated that the "pellet guns were introduced in 2010 as an accepted weapon of riot control". and added that "In case this (pellet shotgun) is withdrawn, the CRPF would have no recourse in extreme situations but to open fire with rifles, which may cause more fatalities."

A senior security official in Kashmir told The Washington Post:

There is an orchestrated campaign against pellet guns precisely because it is doing the work of effectively controlling the violent mob protests. When there is a determined militant crowd hurling sharp stones at us and [they] break our helmets, shields and bones, then we need to act. Tear-gas shells are not very effective because protesters use wet cloth to cover their eyes and are back in action in two minutes.

In July 2016, Rajnath Singh, Home Minister of India, while responding to questions related to the increase in violent incidents in Kashmir, stated that a panel to study and recommend the alternatives to pellet guns would be established.

=== Replacements ===
Various replacements for pellet guns have been suggested, such as chili grenades, dye-marker filled grenades, tear smoke grenades, stun grenades, PAVA (Pelargonic Acid Vanillyl Amide/ Nonivamide) shells, long-range acoustic devices, and shock batons. It has also been suggested that the pellets could be made from polymer, soft plastic, rubber, or paper. In July 2016, a seven-member expert committee headed by Indian Administrative Service (IAS) officer T. V. S. N. Prasad, a joint secretary in the Ministry of Home Affairs, looked into the alternatives to pellet guns. To the committee, the Indian Army advocated the mediation of crowd control with pepper guns, acoustic devices, and chili grenades. The committee submitted its report to Home Secretary and IAS officer Rajiv Mehrishi in September 2016.

The first batch of around 1,000 chili-filled grenades were dispatched to the Kashmir valley in late 2016. Various other replacements have been tried, such as pepper balls, oleoresin capsicum grenades, CONDOR rubber pellets, and FN303 guns in 2016.

In 2018, a Border Security Force (BSF) workshop in Tekanpur Academy modified pellet guns with deflectors to minimize injuries.

== Other crowd control equipment ==
Since 2017, as a part of a graded response to violent protests, Indian security forces have used plastic bullets before employing pellet guns. They have multiple options for enforcing crowd control, such as tear smoke shells, PAVA shells, rubber bullets fired from gas guns, plastic bullets and pellet guns, before finally resorting to opening fire.

=== Tear gas ===
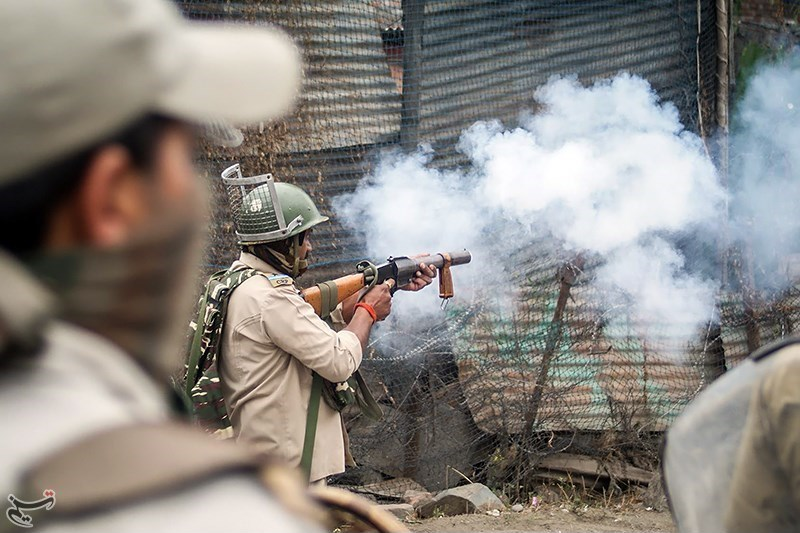
A policeman holding a tear gas gun during clashes with protesters after Eid prayers in Kashmir on 2018-09-02

Tear-gas shells are commonly used as crowd and riot control equipment in Jammu and Kashmir.

In June 2010, Tufail Ahmed Mattoo died after a tear gas canister struck him on the head. The death of Mattoo by the tear gas canister led to mob violence and resulted in the death of more than 100 people. Following the incident, a committee was set up to decide the standard operating procedures to be followed for dispersing "unlawful assemblies with minimum force and collateral damage". The committee's report on "the standard operating procedures to deal with public agitations with non-lethal means" stated that the effectiveness of tear gas is limited in open areas and is also determined by the wind conditions. The report also concluded that "[p]eople have learned protective tricks like the use of wet cloth to counter it. Experienced rioters do not take it seriously. The shells are either smothered with a wet gunny bag or thrown back at the police".

In August 2016, Irfan Ahmad, 18, was killed in the Nowhatta after being hit on the left side of his chest by a tear gas shell. The following month, an elderly man inside his home died of cardiac arrest during tear gas shelling in the Kulgam district.

The CRPF have employed several methods to reduce the collateral losses and civilian casualties from crowd control measures. After several rounds of internal testing to identify crowd control weapons that can avoid causing grievous injuries to protestors, the government introduced soft-nosed shells. During its deployment, the plastic of the shell easily melts, releasing a gas that assists in dispersing the crowd. This mechanism renders the soft-nosed shells incapable of inflicting fatal injuries. According to CRPF officers, there also have been advancements in tear smoke munitions which have made it possible to increase the use of these munitions as compared to other weapons used in crowd control. Since the summer of 2018, CRPF have been using chili bombs and soft-nosed tear gas shells.

=== Plastic bullets ===
Terminal Ballistics Research Laboratory under the Defence Research and Development Organisation (DRDO) developed plastic bullets as an alternative to pellet guns for crowd control in Jammu and Kashmir. According to the director of the laboratory, plastic bullets are 500 times less lethal than pellets. The plastic bullets can be fired from the same rifles by changing the magazine. They can be fired from AK-47 and INSAS rifles commonly used by the security forces in the region. According to CRPF officials, the plastic bullets can be fired only in single-shot mode and not in burst mode. Additionally, plastic bullets can be used only on one person at a time, in contrast to pellet guns which can cover a larger area and reach multiple persons. 21,000 rounds of plastic bullets were sent to Kashmir in 2018 for riot control. Usage of plastic bullets is based on the list of non lethal weapons that are approved by the United Nations peacekeeping standards for crowd control.

=== Chili grenades ===
Indian military scientists from DRDO developed chili grenades for use as stun grenades against terrorists. In 2009, DRDO stated that the chili grenades would use bhut jolokia, one of the world's hottest chili powders, to control rioters and in counter-insurgency operations. BBC reported bhut Jholokia to be 1,000 times stronger than other variants of chili. The scientists claimed that chili grenades could be adapted into "civilian variants" for crowd control in a way similar to pepper spray. The chili grenades use naga chili apart from bhut jolokia.

In 2016, the Border Security Force gave a demonstration to the media of chili-filled shells. The shells were a stronger irritant than pepper spray and tear gas. Rifles and pump-action guns are capable of firing these shells, and the guns can be assembled on police vehicles. In 2016, the first batch of 1,000 chili-filled grenades was sent to the Kashmir Valley for use in crowd control.

=== Water cannon ===
Water cannons have been used in Jammu and Kashmir to disperse violent stone-pelting crowds. These have their own limitations, such as low range, limitations of refilling, and inability of the water cannon-mounted trucks to access small lanes. An 8,000-litre (1,800 imp gal; 2,100 US gal) water tank can be emptied by the water cannon in eight minutes and refilling it may not be possible during a riot.

Water cannons with dyed purple water were used on a teachers' protest of July 2018 in Srinagar.

=== Live rounds ===
Firing in the air has often been used to disperse crowds. Live rounds have reportedly also been used by security forces against protestors during violent clashes, leading to civilian deaths.

On 19 July 2016, the Indian army opened fire on protestors who were defying a curfew and throwing stones. Three people were killed. On 15 December 2018, counterinsurgency operations were carried out against militants in Sirnoo village in Pulwama, Kashmir. Three militants and a soldier were killed in the gunfight that ensued. Civilian protestors who gathered at the site violently clashed with the Indian forces, in which seven civilians died with bullet wounds and several others were wounded with pellet injuries.

== Bibliography ==
- Bukhari, Mannan (2015). Kashmir - Scars of Pellet Gun: The Brutal Face of Suppression. Partridge Publishing. ISBN 9781482850062
- Bureau of Police Research and Development, Ministry of Home Affairs, Government of India (2011). Standard Operating Procedures to deal with public agitations with non-lethal measures. Accessed via Scribd on 27 December 2018. Archived link.
- Bureau of Police Research and Development. Study Report on Development and Testing of Effective Non-lethal Weapons/ Technologies and Tactics for Countering Public Agitation with Minimum Force.
- Kriti M Shah (April 2017). Dealing with Violent Civil Protests in India. Observer Research Foundation
