= Plastic bullet =

Less-lethal projectile

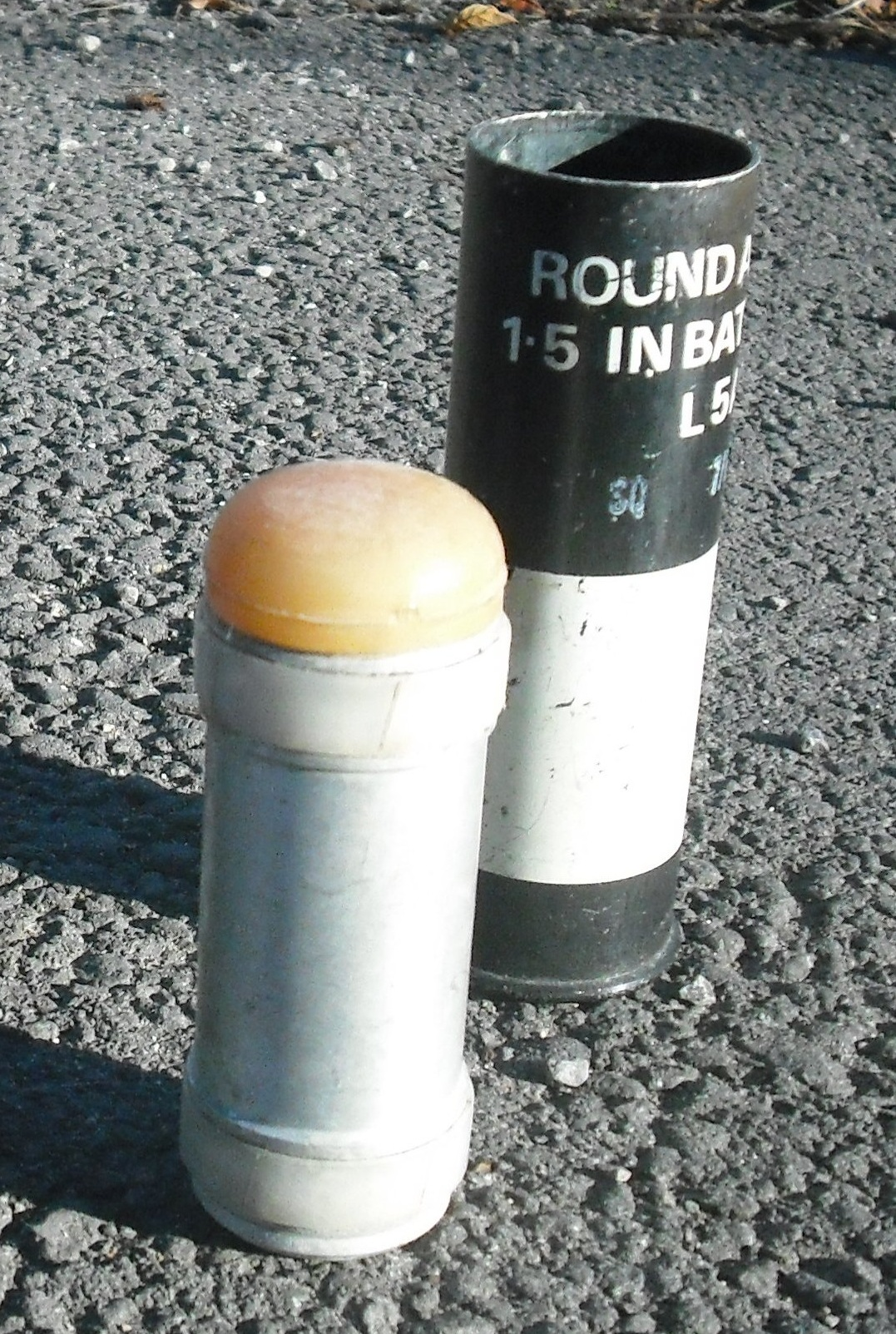
Left and right: composite plastic/aluminium plastic baton round projectile from L21 round and case of L5 round.

Plastic bullet can refer to:

- Plastic baton round: a large, blunt, low-velocity projectile fired from a specialized gun, intended as a less-lethal weapon for riot control and an alternative to rubber bullets.
- Plastic bullet: a conventionally sized and shaped bullet made from a composite material including plastic, fired from a conventional rifle and capable of penetrating human tissue, intended as a less lethal weapon for riot control.
- Plastic bullet (target shooting): a blunt, lightweight handgun bullet intended for short-range target practice, not intended for use as a weapon.

Both types of plastic bullet intended for riot control have caused deaths.

Plastic bullets are generally used for riot control. Some plastic bullets are intended to be aimed at the ground so as to ricochet into the target; others are intended to be fired directly at a person.

Plastic baton rounds were invented by British researchers to provide a more accurate alternative to rubber bullets, and were intended to be fired directly at rioters in Northern Ireland during The Troubles.

An unrelated blunt, low velocity, small-calibre handgun bullet made of hollow plastic is sometimes used for short-range target practice (see recreational use).

== History ==
The plastic baton round was developed in the UK by Porton Down scientists and intended for use against rioters in Northern Ireland during The Troubles, first used there in 1973.

The first version was the L5 Plastic Baton Round (PBR, commonly called plastic bullet). It was created to replace rubber baton rounds (rubber bullets), which had been used in Northern Ireland since 1970 and which were withdrawn by the end of 1975. Rubber bullets were meant to be fired at the legs of rioters or the ground in front of them. However, they were often fired directly at people from close range and sometimes at the totally innocent. The use of rubber bullets in Northern Ireland resulted in at least three people being killed and many more badly injured.

The plastic bullet could be fired directly at people and at longer ranges. It was intended to be a projectile of similar effect on its target as the rubber bullet. Officially, its advantage over the rubber bullet was claimed to be greater accuracy.

The first plastic bullet was made of PVC (some sources say polyurethane), weighed 135 g (4.75 oz), was 38 mm (1.5 in) diameter and 'rather over' 102 mm (4 in) long. The new plastic bullet was a similar size to but lighter than the 149 g (5.25 oz) rubber bullet, but the considerably longer range of the plastic bullet—33–66 m (36–72 yd) against 23–46 m (25–50 yd)—implies an appreciably higher muzzle velocity. An analysis made in 1976 concluded that the plastic bullet would prove to be more dangerous than the rubber bullet it replaced, especially if used abusively at short distances.

In Northern Ireland between their first use in February 1973 and February 1983, plastic bullets killed four times as many people round for round as the rubber bullets they replaced.

The final variant of the L5 plastic bullet—the L5A7—was introduced in 1994. The L5 was replaced by the L21A1 in 2001. The L21 plastic bullet was fired from a new launcher, the HK L104A1 riot gun, a rifled weapon which gives greater accuracy when used with an optical sight than the smooth bore weapons used to fire the earlier L5 rounds.

A 2003 study for the Northern Ireland Human Rights Commission found that the new L21 round was 'potentially more lethal' since it was inaccurate and 2.5 times more likely to penetrate body tissue than the older L5 round. One in three L21 rounds missed their target, while 10% of the L21 rounds fired caused injury compared to 1.14% of the L5 rounds. The Defence Scientific Advisory Council found that the L21 round hitting end on could penetrate a human skull and lodge in the brain, killing the victim; also that the L21 round posed more risk to innocent bystanders than the L5 due to its greater potential ricochet.

The L21 was replaced by the L60A1 Attenuated Energy Projectile in June 2005 due to tests showing that the L21 was more dangerous than earlier rounds especially when striking the head.

== Usage—plastic baton rounds ==
=== Use in Northern Ireland ===
Numbers of rubber and plastic bullets fired in Northern Ireland 1970–1981
Year	Rubber bullets	Plastic bullets
1970	238	
1971	16,752	
1972	23,363	
1973	12,724	42
1974	2,612	216
1975	145	3,556
1976		3,464
1977		1,490
1978		1,734
1979		1,271
1980		1,231
1981		29,665
Sub-total	55,834	42,669
Total	98,503	

The British Army in Northern Ireland was issued with plastic bullets in August 1972, the intention being to replace the use of rubber bullets, and first used by them in February 1973; while the Royal Ulster Constabulary (RUC) first 'tried out' the new round during a riot on 12 August 1973. Shortly after their introduction it was discovered plastic bullets were lethal at certain ranges. Rubber bullets had been withdrawn from Northern Ireland by the end of 1975.

Fourteen people were killed by plastic bullet impacts; half of them were children and all but one were from the Catholic community. The deaths occurred over 14 years, from 1975 to 1989. Most of the deaths were allegedly caused by the British security forces misusing the weapon, firing at close range and at chest or head level rather than targeting below the waist.

The first person to be killed by a plastic bullet was 10 year old Stephen Geddis, who died on 30 August 1975 in hospital, two days after being shot by the British Army in west Belfast. One of the most high-profile plastic bullet victims was 12 year old Carol Ann Kelly from west Belfast, who died in hospital on 22 May 1981 after being shot in the head by a member of the Royal Regiment of Fusiliers on 19 May 1981.

In 1982, the European Parliament called on member states to ban the use of plastic bullets. However, they continued to be used by the British security forces in Northern Ireland. In 1984 the United Campaign Against Plastic Bullets was founded, calling for plastic bullets to be banned in Northern Ireland. One of its founders, Emma Groves, had been permanently blinded in 1971 when a British soldier shot her in the face with a rubber bullet. During rioting in July 1997, a 14 year old boy was struck in the head by a plastic bullet and spent three days in a coma.

From 1973 to 1981, just over 42,600 plastic bullets were fired in Northern Ireland. By 2005, 125,000 baton rounds had been fired, most of them plastic bullets.

=== Use elsewhere ===
During the weekend of 20 April 2001, at the anti-FTAA protest in Quebec City, Canada, plastic bullets were used by police forces against protesters attempting to breach the security fences. Plastic bullets were used against protesters at a protest against globalization in Quebec in 2001, where one individual reportedly underwent an emergency tracheotomy after being hit in the throat.

Plastic bullets were approved for policing in England and Wales in June 2001. Plastic bullets were also authorized for G8 summit protests in Gleneagles, Scotland in July 2005. A plastic bullet was successfully used to disarm a hostage taker armed with a machete in Dorchester, England in November 2002.

In September 2004, seven picketing shipbuilders were injured in a tear-gas and plastic bullet assault in Cadiz, Spain.

In 1990, Kenyan riot police raided a room at the University of Nairobi beating students with batons. A fleeing female student was shot in the stomach with a plastic bullet.

Venezuelan police and soldiers fired plastic bullets at student protesters in Caracas in December 2010.

Foam-tipped plastic bullets were employed by U.S. Marines in a trial in the Iraq War but were determined to be ineffectual.

== Usage—penetrating plastic bullets ==
=== Use in Israel ===
Israeli plastic bullets are not baton rounds and are capable of penetrating all body tissue.

In August 1988, the Israeli army began using plastic bullets for crowd control by the military administration of the West Bank and Gaza Strip. Israeli Defense Minister Yitzhak Rabin explained the plastic bullets were intended to cause more injuries to Palestinian rioters. Army commanders hoped that their use would reduce Palestinian stone-throwing, however this did not happen during the first month of their use in which Israeli plastic bullets killed eight Palestinians.

In March 1990, an army report - "Uprising Data" - found 128 "local residents" had been killed by plastic bullets. According to the army rules of engagement the use of plastic bullets is permitted in case of a "violent riot", defined as: "a disturbance with the participation of three or more persons, including stone throwing, erection of a barrier or barricade, burning a tire." Some of the instructions under Rules of Engagement include:

- Plastic bullet only to be fired under order from commanding officer

- Not to be fired at a range of less than 70 metres

- Aimed below knee

- "Avoid aiming fire at children below the age of 14 and at women."

From April to May 1989, during the early stages of the First Intifada, five young people were killed by plastic bullets fired by Israeli soldiers, four of whom were under 14 years old.

Following a visit to a Nablus Hospital a group of four Israeli doctors reported: "The plastic bullet can penetrate all tissue. Even if the wound caused by the plastic is less severe than that caused by conventional bullets, it is still a very severe wound. The bullet is capable of striking internal organs, and as occurred in cases that were hospitalised in al-Ittihad hospital, the bullet struck the liver, intestines, spleen and blood vessels. It is superfluous to add that such a wound can be fatal."

=== Use in Jammu and Kashmir ===
India's Terminal Ballistics Research Laboratory in Chandigarh has developed plastic bullets designed to be fired from conventional rifles as an alternative to using pellet guns for crowd control.

These plastic bullets—not baton rounds—can be fired from AK-47 and INSAS rifles and have been used by Indian security forces for crowd control in Jammu and Kashmir in India. They are used along with other riot control agents such as tear gas, chili grenades, and pellet guns (riot shotguns that fire pellet cartridges) by security forces against stone pelting protesters during violent clashes in Jammu and Kashmir.

According to Central Reserve Police Force (CRPF) officials, the plastic bullets can only be fired in single shot mode and not in burst mode. The bullets are claimed to penetrate 20mm into human targets.

21,000 rounds of plastic bullets were sent to Kashmir in 2018 for riot control. A anonymous source at the Indian Ministry of Home Affairs claimed that the use of plastic bullets is based on the list of non-lethal weapons approved by the United Nations peacekeeping standards for crowd control.

== Design ==
The original UK plastic bullet deployed in 1972 weighs around 135 g (4.75 oz) and was intended to be effective at a range of 33 to 66 m (36 to 72 yd).

== Recreational use ==
A type of reusable plastic bullet intended for short-range target practice using conventional handguns is available, designed to be propelled purely by an ordinary cartridge primer.

Speer plastic bullets, the only widely available brand, are flat-nosed hollow plastic cylinders, are available in .357/.38, 9 mm, .44, and .45 calibers, and are designed for use primarily in revolvers, as the flat nose of the bullet does not feed well in most magazine fed actions. The slow moving plastic bullets may be captured undamaged and reused numerous times if a suitable backstop is used. For use in revolvers, .38 Special and .44 Special versions also include plastic cases, which can be primed and de-primed by hand with minimal tools. For other calibers, standard brass cases are used.

== See also ==
- Polymer-cased ammunition, sometimes mistakenly called "plastic bullet"
- Airsoft pellets
- Eye injuries in the 2019–2020 Chilean protests
- Non-lethal weapon
- Sponge grenade
- Wax bullet
- Wooden bullet
