= Over ground worker =

Term describing those who supply terrorists with non-violent logistical resources

Over ground workers (OGWs), according to Indian security forces, are people who help militants, or terrorists, with logistical support, cash, shelter, and other infrastructure with which armed groups and insurgency movements such as Hizbul Mujahideen and Jaish-e-Muhammad in Jammu and Kashmir can operate. OGWs play a vital role in militant attacks, providing real-time information and support to the tactical elements. Over ground workers have diversified into other roles such as stone-pelting, mob-rioting, ideological support, radicalisation, and recruitment of militants. In 2020, up until 8 June, around 135 over ground workers were arrested in Jammu and Kashmir by the Jammu and Kashmir police. While the term is used and associated extensively with the Kashmir region, the term has also been used officially in other parts of India where insurgency is still active, such as in the Naxalite–Maoist insurgency and in Meghalaya for the Garo National Liberation Army.

== Terminology ==
An over ground worker (OGW), to the Indian security forces, is an individual who helps militants/terrorists with logistical support, cash, shelter, and other infrastructure with which armed groups and insurgency movements in the region operate. While the term is used and associated extensively with the Kashmir region, the term can also be used officially in other parts of India where insurgency is still active, such as in Meghalaya where over ground workers are associated with the Garo National Liberation Army. Sashastra Seema Bal (SSB) reported arresting "84 linkman/ OGW" in 2017 in the anti-insurgency movement against the Naxals-Maoists. Many times the line between a militant operative or facilitator and an OGW blurs. For the Jammu and Kashmir Police "anybody who supports the militants" is categorized a potential OGW. According to a police official:

... if militants are seen as fish, OGWs are the water that ensures their survival [...] OGW is a militant without a weapon. An OGW is a militant on the threshold of using a gun against the security forces and innocent civilians. [...] in the operational terms, a stone-pelter or a habitual offender is not something we regard as a hardcore OGW [...] Such elements are here today and gone tomorrow. But, a hardcore OGW lives supporting the gun and finally dies wielding it.

There is also a sense of confusion and ambiguity surrounding the term. Human rights activist Khurram Pervez notes that OGW is not a legal term and is not properly defined by any law. Because of this, "OGW is a term created by security agencies to legitimise violence".

== Roles ==
Apart from providing logistical support and "act[ing] as the eyes and ears of the underground militants", OGWs have diversified into numerous other roles. OGWs act as an organised network which also takes part in mob rioting. After the death of a soldier in stone-pelting in Kashmir, the Indian army chief said that "stone-pelters are nothing but over ground workers of terror outfits". Following the revocation of the special status of Jammu and Kashmir, OGWs forced shops to close using violence and attacked civilians, resulting in deaths. As part of logistical support, OGWs help with the movement of arms, ammunition, explosives, and combat equipment.

OGWs also make false allegations against the security forces. Creating a sense of alienation is also one of the responsibilities of OGWs—in other words, conducting psychological warfare against the government. Lt Gen K K Khanna writes:

Over ground workers often lodge false allegation against the security forces to enforce caution and keep units busy in infructuous investigations. NGOs, state human right organizations, local press, and opposition leaders are used to check exuberance of the security forces. At times the insurgents launch attacks in a way that draws reprisals from the security forces against the population. This helps their cause as the people witness atrocities of the forces. Politicians organize mass agitations […]

OGWs provide real-time information to the terrorist elements or militant groups to carry out tactical operations. While the tactical operations are carried out by those who are motivated for multiple reasons such as religious reasons, monetary reasons etc., OGWs are mainly motivated by money. This synergy between the OGWs and those who carry out the tactical operations results in cumulative impact. An OGW many provide his or her services to multiple organisations.

== Recruiting ==
Recruits can vary in age from 7 years old all the way up to 32 years and sometimes above. Potential recruits includes those who have had the Jammu and Kashmir Public Safety Act slapped on them or those who have spent time in jail with experienced militants. A process of "systematic entrapment" is followed. Many children below the age of 18 are also recruited as OGWs in Jaamat (K), Hizbul Mujaheddin, Laskhar-e-Taiba (LeT), and Jaish-e-Muhammad (JeM). In December 2018, Mudasir Rashid Parray, a 15-year-old, was killed in a gunfight with security forces that lasted for 16 hours in Mujgund area of Srinagar. Reports stated that Mudasir was an OGW for two LeT commanders. Women are also recruited.

The background of OGWs varies. They can be government servants, lawyers, or media personalities. In 2018, the National Investigation Agency charged three men of being OGWs. One of the OGWs was a BSc Nursing student at Sher-e-Kashmir Institute of Medical Sciences, Srinagar, while the other two were truckers. In the aftermath of the Pulwama attack, an OGW who was a furniture shop owner was arrested. To minimize OGW recruitment, Jamaat-e-Islami Kashmir was deemed illegal under the Unlawful Activities (Prevention) Act in 2019.

== Categorization ==
As per a CLAWS report OGWs can be categorised as:

1) OGWs for Logistic Support (OGWLS) to Strike teams.
2) OGWs managing Funding (OGWF).
3) OGWs providing Ideological Support (OGWIS).
4) OGWs providing Radicalisation Support (OGWRS).
5) OGWs for Recruitment of Terrorists (OGWR).
6) OGWs generating negative Perceptions and Sentiment amongst the Awaam (OGWPS).

== Response, capture, and deaths ==
The presence of over ground workers remains an obstacle to peace in the region. Colonel K C Dixit of Manohar Parrikar Institute for Defense Studies and Analyses writes:

Neutralization of terrorists and their support base must be in consonance with laws of land so that the civil face of the governance is always visible [...] The handling of over ground workers also has to be as per the laws. [...]

Overtime systematic tracking of OGWs has been done. As explained by an Inspector-General of Police in Kashmir: "The 'A category' OGW will be booked under the Jammu and Kashmir Public Safety Act [...] the 'B category' will be arrested and the parents of the 'C category' will be called and counselled and later released". It is often the case that during encounters, militants and OGWs are found together, and accordingly die together. In other cases, OGWs have been caught separately, such as in the aftermath of the 2019 Pulwama attack. During the aftermath of the revocation of the special status of Jammu and Kashmir, connectivity was suspended, and as a result it was found that OGWs had been forced to operate from Chandigarh.

In the first two months of 2020, 40 OGWs were arrested. The most recent publicized captures of an OGW was on 5 May, followed by 2 OGWs of Hizbul Mujahideen and Ansar Ghazwat-ul-Hind on 22 May, and three on 24 May 2020. Up until 8 June, around 135 overground workers were arrested in the Jammu and Kashmir by the Jammu and Kashmir police.
