= Riot shotgun =

Type of shotgun

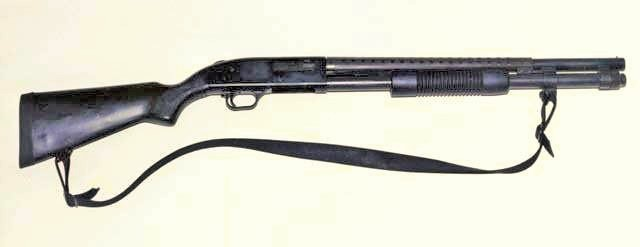
Mossberg 590 pump-action riot shotgun, with 20-inch barrel, black plastic furniture, and long magazine tube

A riot shotgun is a shotgun designed or modified for use as a primarily defensive weapon, by the use of a short barrel and sometimes a larger magazine capacity than shotguns marketed for hunting. The riot shotgun is used by military personnel for guard duty and was at one time used for riot control, and is commonly used as a door breaching and patrol weapon by law enforcement personnel, as well as a home defense weapon by civilians. Guns of this type are often labeled as breaching shotguns, tactical shotguns or special-purpose shotguns to denote the larger scope of their use; however, these are largely marketing terms.

== Characteristics ==
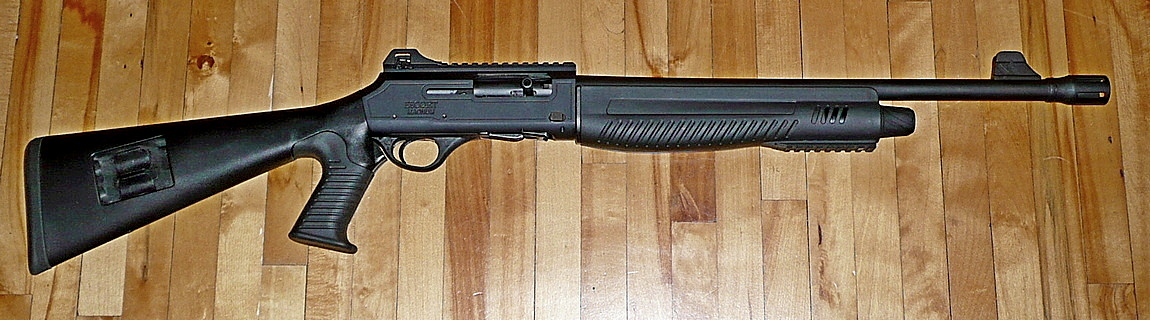
Hatsan Escort Magnum, security and law enforcement purpose 12 gauge semi-automatic shotgun

The primary characteristic of a riot shotgun is a "short" barrel (generally 14 to 20 inches (360 to 510 mm) long; 18 in (460 mm) is the shortest length available to civilians in the U.S. that is not subject to additional federal ATF regulation) which makes the shotgun more compact and easier to handle, easier to stow inside a police vehicle, and more suitable for quick aiming at (close) stationary targets. Generally they have an open (cylinder-bore) choke, to permit the shot to spread quickly and to allow use with other types of projectiles, and they may be equipped with bead, rifle, or ghost-ring sights. Riot guns are most often pump-action due to this design's lower cost and higher reliability, although in recent years a number of semi-automatic shotguns designed primarily for defensive use have become available and are used by military, law enforcement and civilians alike.

Most riot guns are chambered in 12-gauge and can handle either 2.75" (70 mm) "standard-length" or 3" (76 mm) "magnum-length" cartridges. Most non-shotshell loads, such as less lethal ammunition like bean bags, are made only in 12-gauge. However, 20-gauge and .410 shotguns in riot gun configuration are available. Smaller bores are popular for home defense, as the reduced power and recoil make them more suitable for less experienced shooters who may be more recoil-sensitive.

While most hunting shotguns hold between two and five shells (often three shells, to comply with U.S. regulations for migratory bird hunting), riot shotguns can have a magazine tube as long as the barrel, allowing for 6 to 10 shells to be loaded depending on the model, barrel length, and type of shells loaded. Standard-capacity magazine tubes are also used on riot shotguns. For example, the popular Remington 870 Police model riot shotgun often ships and is used with the stock four-round magazine tube by Law Enforcement personnel.

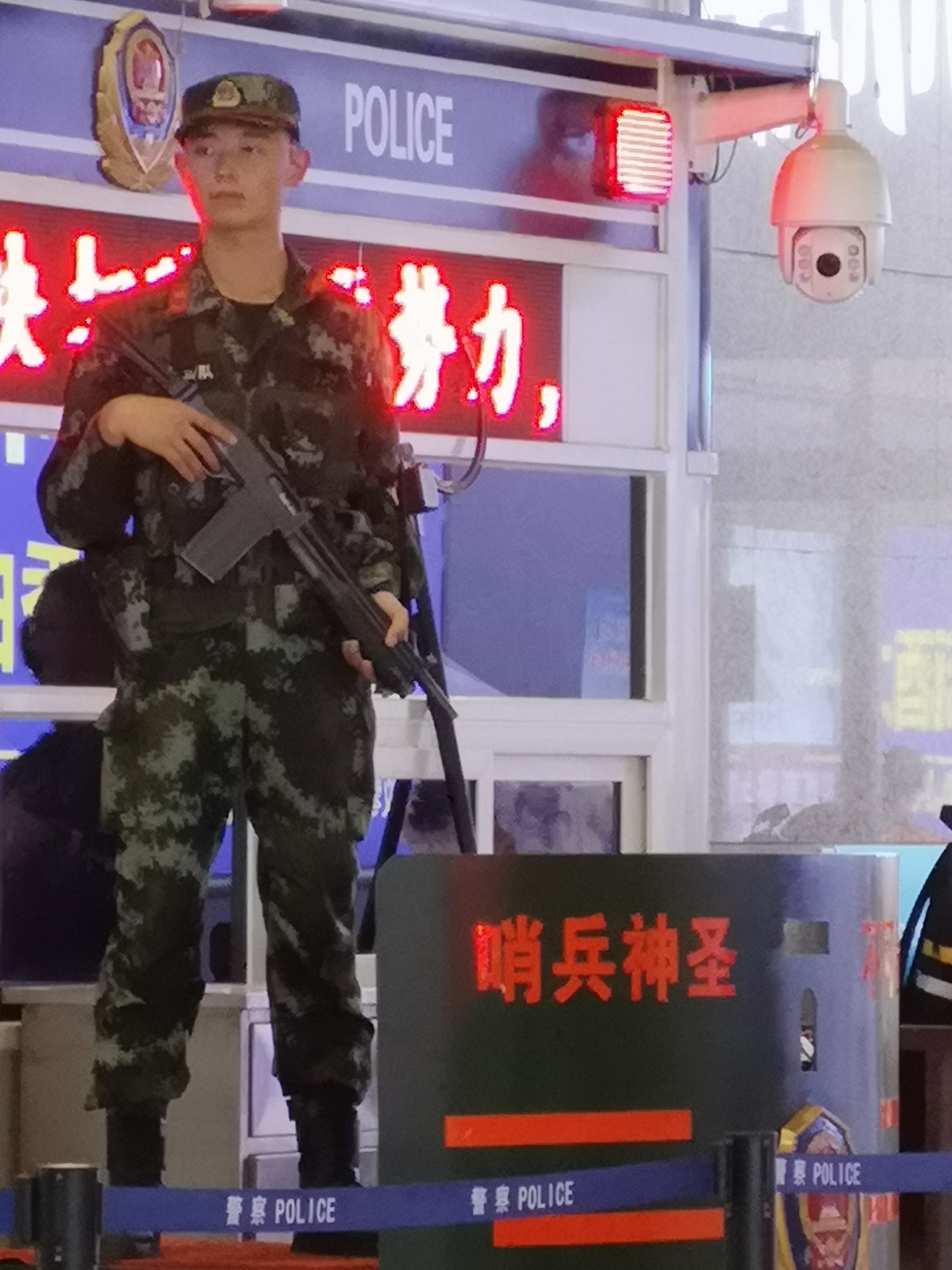
An armed Chinese policeman stands guard with a Hawk Industries Type 97-2 shotgun. The Type 97-2 in the image is a 12-gauge pump-action shotgun configured with a detachable magazine, black plastic furniture and a folding stock.

Configurations of grips and stocks for riot shotguns vary widely, but often feature reinforced plastic "furniture" instead of the wood common on hunting firearms. Wood was used for riot gun stocks in the past, and sometimes still is. As compared to hunting shotguns, riot guns more often feature pistol grips, with or without a shoulder stock. Without a shoulder stock (or with a folding stock), a riot shotgun becomes more compact and thus is able to be brought to bear more rapidly in very close quarters. With the stock, the pistol grip facilitates control of the weapon and provides a more ergonomic grip when the shotgun is fired from the shoulder. Foregrips, or forends, also vary, often with the inclusion of a pistol-grip fore-end (further increasing control and absorbing recoil), and/or the addition of an accessory rail or other mounting point for a tactical light.

The multiple projectile ability of a shotgun greatly increases the probability of a hit on an assailant, and the multiple projectiles increase the likelihood of a disabling hit. Though many sizes and configurations of shotshell are used by police, among the most common is the 12-gauge 2 3/4-inch (70 mm) 00 ("double-aught") buckshot shell, which consists of 8 or 9 .33 caliber (8.5 mm) round lead balls, each of which is similar in size and velocity to a 9mm/.38 caliber handgun bullet (which actually have a diameter of .354-.357"). This shot spreads out to a greater or lesser degree depending on the barrel choke, and can be effective at ranges as far as 75 yards (70 m). Also popular is the #4 buckshot load, which sacrifices individual pellet size (each pellet is about .24 caliber) for greater numbers (usually 21 pellets per shell) and is very effective at most indoor ranges (<50 feet), where the shot has less distance in which to scatter and thus hits the target in a relatively localized pattern. "Deer slugs" (1 oz rifled slugs) provide a powerful, accurate shot with minimal spread, but more risk of overpenetration. "Hybrid" loads combining different sizes of shot, or a slug and shot, are available but less common. These cartridges generally advertise a compromise or "best of both worlds" between the power of slugs or buckshot and the spread of smaller pellets.

The delivery of the large number of projectiles simultaneously makes the shotgun the most effective short range weapon commonly used, with a hit probability 45% greater than a submachine gun, and twice as great as an assault rifle. The ability to use shotgun slugs extends the range and penetration capability of the shotgun. Police officers in the US commonly secure a shotgun in their vehicles, for use when armed resistance is expected or at any time greater firepower than the officer's sidearm is needed.

== Riot vs. combat shotguns ==
The difference between the riot shotgun and the combat shotgun is blurry, and may be more a matter of application than design. A combat shotgun would be used in military combat situations as a primarily offensive weapon, where a riot shotgun would be used in paramilitary, law enforcement or civilian situations as a primarily defensive weapon. Common additions to a combat shotgun would be provision for attaching a bayonet, and the addition of a ventilated heat shield over the barrel (though this heat shield is a common addition to riot shotguns as well) designed to prevent the operator's fingers from being burned by a barrel heated by multiple shots, and thus to allow the operator to secure a full grip on the weapon while using the attached bayonet, even when the barrel is far too hot to touch (otherwise, there is little reason to enshroud the barrel and hinder the cooling airflow). One or both of these features can be seen on many military long-arms, including the 1903 Springfield, the SMLE, M1 Garand, and Mauser rifles, to name some of the more obvious types. The U.S. Army specifications for shotguns require a metal trigger guard for durability, which reduces the number of "special purpose" models used by police that would also be suitable for the military (the Mossberg 590A1 and Benelli M1014 are the standard-issue pump and semi-auto shotguns currently in service; the standard Mossberg 500 and 590 models, and most variants of the Remington 870, have plastic trigger groups).

Riot shotguns are also more limited in range than combat shotguns by the nature of their use. A combat shotgun is considered effective out to 75 yards (70 m) because on average at least 1 pellet of a 9 pellet 00 buckshot load will hit a human sized target at that range. This is enough to degrade the combat effectiveness of an enemy soldier, but it is not enough to reliably disable an assailant in a defensive situation. For that, there must be multiple hits to the target, enough that one or more pellets will hit a vital region. Generally this is well under 27 yards (25 meters) with a cylinder bore barrel. Beyond this range, slugs and good iron sights are recommended, extending the range to over 109 yards (100 meters).

== Less lethal alternatives ==
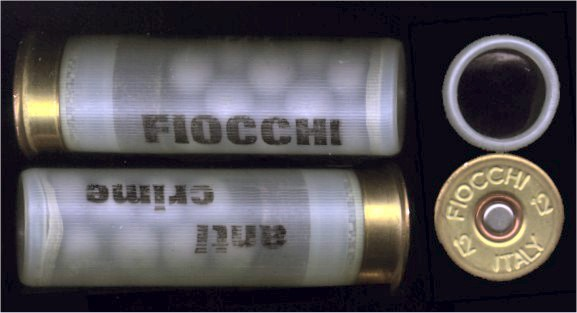
Two rounds of Fiocchi 12 gauge rubber buckshot

The latter part of the 20th century saw a new role for the riot shotgun, with the advent of a wide variety of less lethal ammunition for police use. These vary from the early "bean bag" shooting flexible baton rounds, rubber bullets and other impact munitions, to tear gas and, released in October 2009, a 12 gauge electroshock weapon from TASER International. Using the shotgun as the delivery system allows the officers to quickly choose a lethal or a less lethal weapon, so responding officers can adapt to changing situations. An officer in a standoff can quickly eject a chambered buckshot cartridge and replace it with a less-lethal cartridge such as a bean bag, and is not required to unload the magazine as with most rifles or handguns. Alternatively, one officer can be equipped with less lethal munitions, while others, equipped with buckshot, can provide a backup in case the less lethal rounds fail to stop the target.

== Entry and breaching shotguns ==
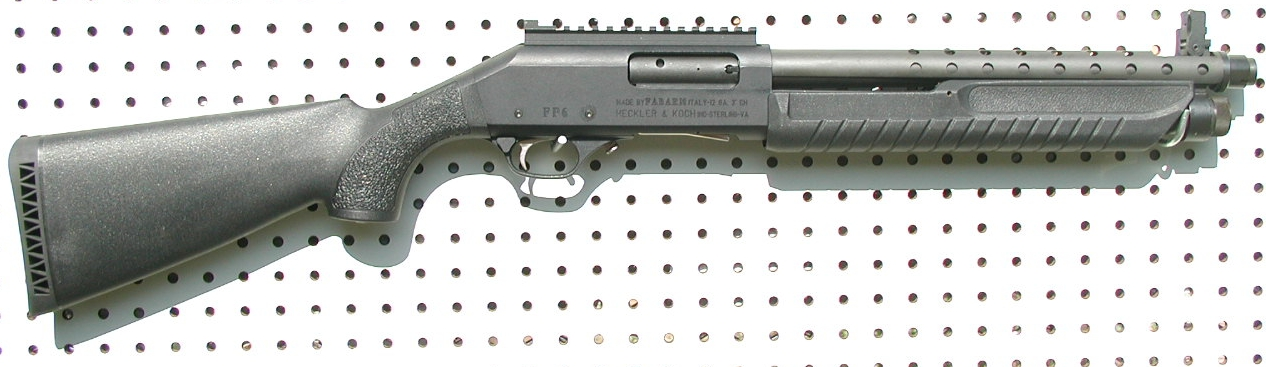
H&K Fabarm FP6 Entry - features a 14" barrel and is subject to regulation under the National Firearms Act in the U.S.

The entry shotgun or breaching shotgun is a role that can be filled by a standard riot shotgun, or one further modified for these purposes. They may have an extremely short barrel (14" or less) and often only a pistol grip rather than a buttstock, or a folding or collapsing buttstock if it is provided with one. In addition, the barrel often has a muzzle brake, used to disperse hot gases rearward, in order to reduce recoil. This type of shotgun is often used to fire special breaching rounds which are designed to disable or destroy door latches while limiting overpenetration of the projectiles used beyond the door. Since these shotguns would in some areas be classified as short barreled shotguns, they are often highly restricted under gun control laws and generally only used by police and military, except in some regions such as the USA.

== Usage ==
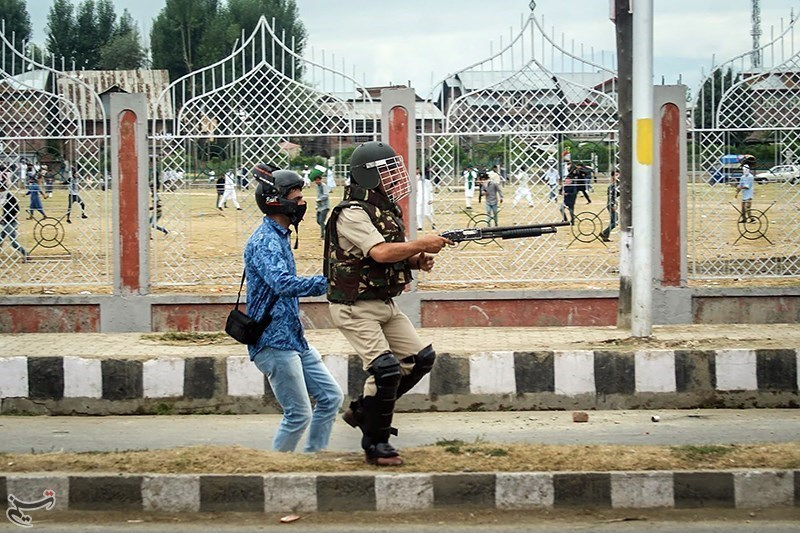
A policeman with a pellet shotgun during a clash with violent protesters in Kashmir in September 2017. Pellet shotguns are used as the last "non-lethal" resort by security forces for crowd control in Jammu and Kashmir.

In 2006, during anti-corruption protests in Budapest (Hungary) some people were hit on the head by shotgun-fired bean bag rounds. At least 3 of them were blinded. One man committed suicide in 2013 because he could not live with the blindness. In addition, many people suffered minor injuries (nose and finger fractures, hemorrhagic bruises), and a few needed permanent psychological help because of the shock.

Pellet shotguns have been used in Bahrain, Egypt and Tunisia for breaking up protests. Since 2010, in the Indian state of Jammu Kashmir, police forces have used pellet shotguns (known locally as pellet guns or pump action guns) as a 'non-lethal' defensive crowd control measure against violent, stone pelting mobs in the region. The usage of pellet shotguns in Jammu and Kashmir has been widely criticised.

In the United States of America, the use of shotguns by police officers is in decline. Many agencies have adopted patrol rifles for increased precision and better range when compared to shotguns. However, many agencies retain the shotguns for use by newer officers and for less-lethal munitions.

== See also ==
- Atchisson AA-12
- Blunderbuss
- Combat shotgun
- Lupara
- Musketoon
- Riot gun
- Sawed-off shotgun
