= Bund Blasting Device =

Military equipment

External image
- Drdo Bund Blasting Device
- Device on display

The DRDO Bund Blasting Device (BBD) is a portable embankment blasting device that was developed by the Terminal Ballistics Research Laboratory (TBRL) of the Defence Research and Development Organisation (DRDO) in India. The device is designed for the controlled demolition of bunds or earthen embankments.

== Design ==
The Bund Blasting Device consists of a hollow charge initiation device and a main high-explosive (HE) filled projectile that is attached to a rocket motor. The hollow charge creates a pilot hole in the embankment, and the HE-filled projectile enters the hole and detonates, creating a large crater that lowers the height of the embankment.

== Testing and Development ==
In August 2014, the DRDO completed user-assisted technical trials of the Bund Blasting Device Mk.II. The tests were conducted by the Army's 120 Engineering Regiment at the Ramgarh range, and the new version of the device was found to be twice as effective as the Mk.I version, requiring only half the number of devices to achieve the same result. Before the Bund Blasting Device Mk.II can be deemed operational and handed over to military forces and production agencies, additional tests are scheduled to be conducted.

== Use ==
The Bund Blasting Device is expected to be used by the Indian military for the controlled demolition of bunds and earthen embankments.
