= Terminal Ballistics Research Laboratory =

Research institute in Chandigarh, India

- Established: January 1968
- Director: Prateek Kishore
- Address: Sector-30, Chandigarh-160003 coordinates = 30.642°N 76.924°E
- Location: Chandigarh
- Operating agency: DRDO
- Website: TBRL Home Page

Terminal Ballistics Research Laboratory (TBRL) is a laboratory of the Defence Research and Development Organisation (DRDO) which comes under Ministry of Defence. Located in Chandigarh, the laboratory has become one of the major DRDO labs in the field of armament studies. TBRL is organized under the cluster of missiles and strategic system of DRDO. The present director of TBRL is Prateek Kishore.

== History ==
TBRL was envisaged in 1961 as a modern armament research laboratory under the Department of Defence Research & Development. It became fully operational in 1967 and was formally inaugurated in January 1968 by the then Defence Minister.

While the main laboratory is situated in Chandigarh, the 5,000-acre (20 km^{2}) firing range is located at Ramgarh in Haryana, 22 km from Chandigarh.

== Areas of work ==
TBRL conducts basic and applied research in the fields of high explosives, detonics and shock waves. It is also involved in evolving data and design parameters for new armaments, as well as assessing the terminal effects of ammunition.

Other areas of work include:

- Performance of armour defeating projectiles and immunity profiles
- Studies of ground shock, blast damage, fragmentation and lethality
- Preparation of safety templates for various weapons
- Studies of underwater detonics and pressure wave propagation
- Explosive forming, cladding and welding.
- Detonation dynamics of high explosives.

== Projects and Products ==
TBRL is responsible for the development of Explosive lenses for India's nuclear weapons. These lenses were used on the nuclear devices detonated in Pokhran-I and Pokhran-II. TBRL also develops explosives-based products for conventional military and civilian use.

- Baffle Ranges/ Practice Firing Ranges for Small Arms - TBRL is the nodal agency in India for design & development of different types of baffle ranges for small arms firing practice. This has reduced the area required as compared to conventional range. Consultancy for construction of such ranges is being provided to various units of armed/paramilitary forces.
- Indigenous Plastic Bonded Explosive - Developed and established technology for Plastic Bonded Explosives (PBX), the latest class of HE compositions with high VOD and higher detonation pressures
- Indigenous Digital Blast Data Recorder - This recorder was developed based on a new design technique, for direct measurement of important blast wave parameters
- Indigenous Transducer for Blast-Measurement - Developed a blast pressure transducer for measuring pressures up to 14 kgm sqcm. It has a sensitivity of 1400 pc/kgm sqcm with a natural frequency of 200 kHz. These transducers are in regular production and being used by a no. of Laboratories. Impulse Generator : It has been developed for the simulation of impulse noise (=190 dB) and testing of artificial earplugs used by Armed Forces Medical Services
- Impulse Generator- It has been developed for the simulation of impulse noise (=190 dB) and testing of artificial earplugs used by Armed Forces Medical Services
- Bund Blasting Device (BBD) - Bund Blasting Device (BBD)Designed and developed Bund Blasting Device for breaching operation.
- Shivalik Multi Mode Grenade - Multi-mode hand grenade designed and developed with reliability >95%.
- Riot control Non-lethal Bullet - TBRL has designed and developed a non-lethal ammunition in two service calibres, a 7.62 mm and .303 inch for effective control of unruly rioting mobs.
- IGLOO Magazine - A new construction technique of laced reinforced concrete construction in which continuous bent shear lacing along with longitudinal reinforcements on both faces of structure element are used for improving the ductility and energy absorbing capacity of the structure has been developed for a capacity of 5 Ton explosives. This design is being used by a no. of DRDO labs, Ordnance factories, DGQA and service depots.
- Bulletproof Panels/Jackets testing - TBRL offers its expertise and specialised facilities for ballistic evaluation of bulletproof panels/helmets against various small arms ammunitions.

=== Technologies for civilian use ===
In 2019, TBRL has developed a Non-lethal Riot control Plastic bullets for use by paramilitary forces and police, including usage for crowd control in Jammu and Kashmir manufactured by the Indian Ordnance Factories. In 2020, TBRL produced 10,000 full-face protective shields designed for the examination of COVID-19 patients, which were provided to the Post-Graduate Institute of Medical Education and Research.

== See also ==
- DRDO
