= I Protest =

Song by MC Kash
- Language: English
- Released: September 2010
- Genre: Hip hop music
- Songwriter: MC Kash

"I Protest" is a rap song by a Kashmiri singer MC Kash, that he sang in 2010. The song that is about the 2010 Kashmir Uprising and Human rights abuses in Kashmir and failures by Kashmiri politicians including the separatists. It became an immediate hit in the valley and outside. The song was sung during protests. The studio where the song was recorded was raided by the local police after the song was released and the staff was questioned about involvement of any separatist leader. Kash, who was emotionally disturbed by the deaths of youth, including his friend, in the unrest, wrote the song. According to Kash, he wrote this in English to spread awareness about the situation in Kashmir. Kash faced hard time in recording his songs after this song was released as most of the studios denied facilitating him and he felt considerable pressure to stop raising such issues in his songs after people close to him showed concern about his security.

== Background ==
2010 Kashmir unrest was a series of violent clashes in Jammu and Kashmir between the state and the locals, who took to streets protesting against the killing of three locals in the state. 110 people were killed in protests by the Indian forces, during this protest.

== Composition ==
The lyrics to the song are graphic. The song's video begin with news clippings about the protests during the 2010 protest. Kash challenges the Indian administration in the song by saying, "Tales from the dark side of a murderous regime, an endless occupation of our land an' our dreams", which is considered sedition according to Indian law. He also criticizes the local media of not fully covering the human right violations in the region by saying "sponsored media who hide this genocide". The song ends with the names of those 65 people who died during the protests in 2010, up until September.

== Influence ==
The song made Kash a popular among the people of the valley and it became a protest anthem for the Kashmiris who were protesting against the state. Kashmiri youth express their protest against the Indian forces, by displaying "I Protest" banners in blogs, social networking sites, etc. Those who didn't come out of their homes usually also put "I Protest" as their status on social networking sites. Groups by the name of "I Protest" were also started on Facebook that was updated with the deeds of Indian security forces against the civilians by posting stories, pictures and videos. Kash influenced many other Kashmiri youngsters to express their feelings through the art of singing. A verse from this song (I Protest, Until My Freedom Has Come) became the title of the book Until My Freedom Has Come, a collection of essays on Kashmir, edited by Sanjay Kak.
