= Chilli grenade =

Non/less-lethal weapon used for incapacitation and crowd control purposes

- Type: Less lethal weapon
- Place of origin: India

Production history
- Designer: Defence Research and Development Organisation

A chilli grenade is a type of non-lethal weapon developed by Indian military scientists.

== Design ==
Similarly to tear gas, chilli grenades use one of the world's spiciest chilli pepper cultivars, bhut jolokia, in weaponised form.

Chilli grenades emit a powerful skin and eye irritant as well as pungent smell that cause the afflicted to leave their cover or become physically incapacitated by the grenade's load.

The thumb-sized bhut jolokia (or ghost chilli) had previously been recognised by Guinness World Records as the hottest pepper in the world with more than 1,000,000 Scoville units, but has since been superseded by three other pepper cultivars, the Trinidad moruga scorpion (1,463,700 SHU), Carolina Reaper (1,641,183 SHU) and in 2023 by Pepper X (2,693,000 SHU).

== Adoption ==
While being developed for the Indian Armed Forces, in 2016, civilian variants were used for crowd control in Jammu and Kashmir.

== Users ==
- India

== See also ==
- Riot control
- Pepper spray
