= T. V. S. N. Prasad =

Indian civil servant

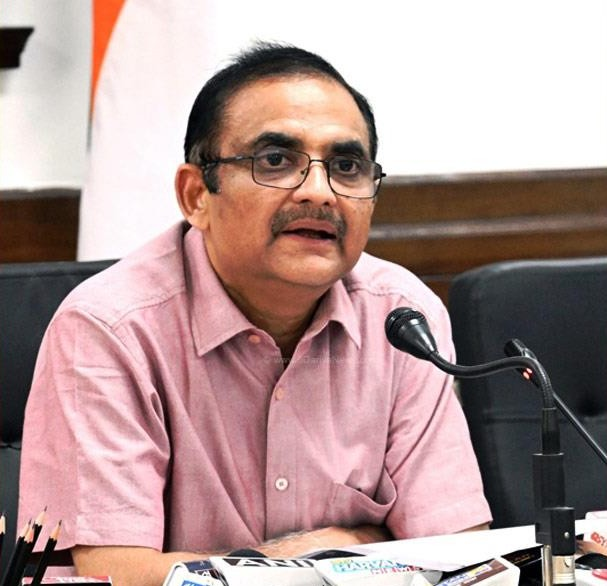

Chief Information Commissioner, Haryana
- Governor: Bandaru Dattatreya
- Chief Minister: Nayab Singh Saini
- Preceded by: Vijai Vardhan

Chief Secretary, Haryana
- Governor: Bandaru Dattatreya
- Chief Minister: Nayab Singh Saini
- Preceded by: Sanjeev Kaushal
- Succeeded by: Vivek Joshi

Mission Director, National Mission for Clean Ganga
- President: Pranab Mukherjee
- Prime Minister: Narendra Modi

Lead Economist, World Bank
- President: Paul Wolfowitz
- Vice President: Inger Anderson

Personal details
- Born: 14 October 1964 (age 61) Razole, Andhra Pradesh, India
- Education: Jawaharlal Nehru Technological University, Hyderabad; Indian Institute of Technology, Delhi, Harvard Kennedy School

T.V.S.N. Prasad (born 14 October 1964) is an economist and Indian civil servant, currently serving as the Chief Information Commissioner of Haryana. He previously served as the Chief Secretary of Haryana.

== Early life and education ==
Prasad was born in a Telugu family from East Godavari District, Andhra Pradesh. He obtained his Bachelor's in Electrical Engineering from Jawaharlal Nehru Technological University, Hyderabad. He later pursued a degree Masters in Public Administration from Harvard Kennedy School as an Edward S. Mason Fellow in Public Policy and Management and a John Kenneth Galbraith Scholar in Infrastructure Economics. He completed his PhD in Economics at the Indian Institute of Technology, Delhi in August 2024.

== Career ==
Prasad joined the Indian Administrative Service in 1988, serving in the Haryana Cadre. As an IAS officer, he has held numerous positions, including Deputy Commissioner, Rohtak and Kurukshetra, Chief Administrator, Haryana State Agricultural Marketing Board, and Principal Secretary, Department of Food, Civil Supplies, and Consumer Affairs, Government of Haryana. During his stint in the Central Government between 2014 and 2018, Prasad served as Mission Director in the National Mission for Clean Ganga and Joint Secretary in the Ministry of Home Affairs.

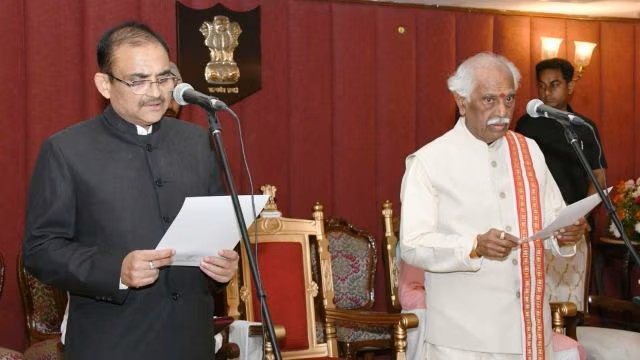
Dr. Prasad taking oath as Chief Information Commissioner

Earlier, he worked as a senior economist at the World Bank, contributing to its policies on power, oil and gas sectors, national economic policies, investments, and infrastructure expansion. He published several articles on economics, energy and infrastructure, including Monitoring Performance of Electric Utilities - Indicators and Benchmarking published by the World Bank in 2009.

He later worked in the Government of Haryana as Finance Secretary, Home Secretary and finally as Chief Secretary. After retirement, he served as the Distinguished Professor at NALSAR National Law University until he took over as Chief Information Commissioner of Haryana. At the end of his career, he and his government faced some criticism. In March 2024, Prasad simultaneously held multiple positions — chief secretary (during leave period of Sanjeev Kaushal, Prasad's predecessor), home secretary, and financial commissioner. Hemant Kumar appealed to the Election Commission, urging it to take corrective action to safeguard administrative efficiency. The Commission refrained from intervening; Prasad was later transferred from his home secretary and financial commissioner roles.
