= MC Kash =

Kashmiri rapper

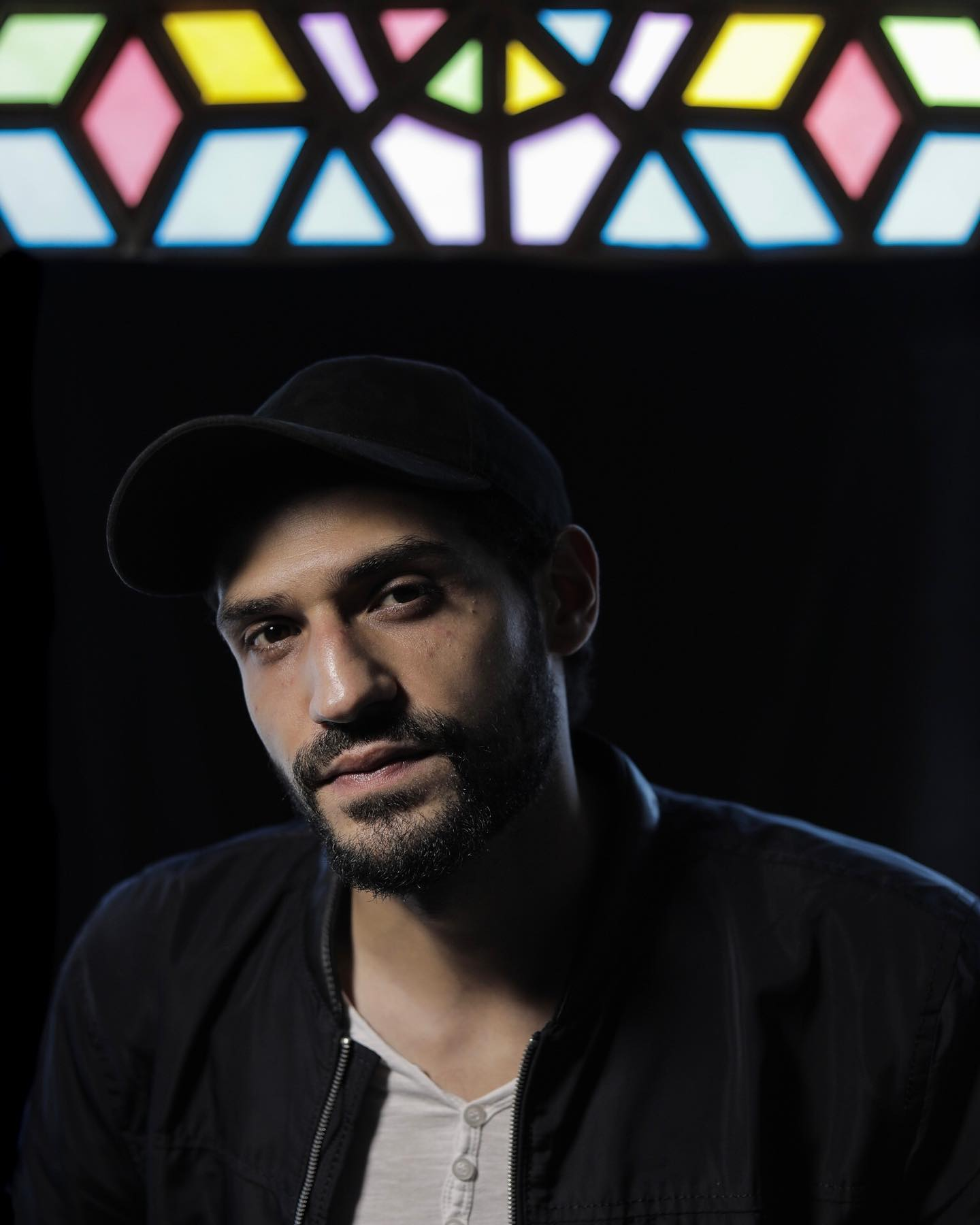
- Mc Kash in 2021

Background information
- Also known as: MC Kash
- Born: Roushan Illahi; 1990 (age 35–36); Srinagar, Jammu and Kashmir
- Genres: Rap, Hip hop
- Instrument: Vocals
- Years active: 2009–2016
- Label: Independent
- Website: mckashofficial.com

Roushan Illahi (born 1990) popularly known by his stage name MC Kash is a Kashmiri emcee/rapper. Taking his stage name from his place of birth- Kashmir, MC Kash is an independent musician based out of Srinagar. Born in 1990, Kash belongs to a generation of Kashmiri Muslims that grew up surrounded by violence of the insurgency in the region. He has been called a Street Poet.

MC Kash burst on the scene with his first studio recorded single "I Protest (Remembrance)" in 2010.

== Biography ==
He was born in 1990 Srinagar in the Indian state of Jammu and Kashmir. His father is a Doctor and his mother is a teacher. He is one of the notable alumni of Burn Hall School. Illahi completed his bachelor's degree in business administration from Islamia College of Science and Commerce, Srinagar (2012). He did his Master's in Convergent Journalism, Central University of Kashmir (2015). Roushan Illahi is also a participant to Swedish Institute's South Asian leadership programme Young Connectors of the Future (2016). Kash says it was a track from Beastie Boys titled ‘No Sleep till Brooklyn’ that introduced him to hip hop music. He credits Tupac Shakur and Eminem as major musical influences. He also mentions being inspired by the civil rights movement in the United States of America.

Kash is considered as the person behind the inception of hip-hop music in Indian Administered Kashmir. Many young and emerging rappers admire Kash and are inspired by his music. He is often referred to as a person who started Hip Hop Kashmir. Rapping has been popular in Kashmir since Kash became famous. Kash got featured in multiple documentaries; one of them being MC Kash, which was nominated in Diversity in Cannes (2018) and he has been featured in other documentaries like Take It in Blood, directed by Rana Ghose. The documentary follows MC Kash as he meets Kashmiri activist Parveena Ahanger. Kash has also been featured the award-winning music documentary Soz: A Ballad of Maladies (2016).

== Music career ==
Illahi released his song "I Protest (Remembrance)" during the 2010 Kashmir unrest which was a series of violent clashes between the locals and security forces. The song became an "anthem of dissent." He has been an idol to many emerging rappers of Kashmir. MC Kash is considered as one of the most prominent face of protest music in South Asia. with his rap being downloaded and seen as an act of protest by youth of Kashmir. Songs like "Listen, My Brother", "Rebel RebubliK : Liberation", "Heart of a Rebel", "Take it in Blood" and many other songs were a part of MC Kash's album Rebel RepubliK. He portrays the daily hardships of the people living in the valley. In 2016 he collaborated with 101 India for the first ever sufi rap song with the song hitting many views. It was described as "sufi-ethnic rock meets hip hop in India's first ever sufi rap. India's first Sufi Rap brings together Alif's signature Sufi ethnic rock sound with Kashmiri rapper MC Kash's strong lyrics and hip hop beats" by Hindustan Times.

== Personal views ==
MC Kash has been covered by BBC and Fox traveller where he mostly spoke of Kashmir and the human rights abuses in Kashmir. Explaining his choice of English language, he says "English is a universal language. Kashmiris know how they have suffered. So if I went on to rap about it in Kashmiri, that would be useless".

He relates Gaza and Kashmir saying, "Gaza and Kashmir are related. A stone relates us. Humiliation relates us. Occupation relates us. Anger relates us. The human rights violations relate us. Intifada relates us," he tells the BBC.

In late 2010, the Indian police raided his studio see if he was being backed by a separatist or militant. MC Kash said in an interview that he is independent: "Nobody is paying me. Nobody told me to go sing about Kashmir."

== Discography ==
1. The Vault (2009–2012) MC Kash songs produced between 2009 & 2012.
2. Anno Domini Beats, Southpaw, MC Kash.
3. I Protest (Remembrance)
4. Take It in Blood (2011)
5. The Bridge of No Return (2012)
6. Beneath This Sky, (2011)
7. One young Kashmir, (2011)
8. Rebel Republik (2012); Debut studio album
9. I See a Massacre (2012)
10. Listen my Brother (2012)
11. Family Portrait (2012)
12. Rebel Republik: Liberation (2013)
13. Orchestra of War, Beethoven Fur Elise Remix (2013).
14. Hukus Bukus (2014) Flying Carpet Productions.
15. Like A Sufi, 101India (2016)
