= Jammu and Kashmir Police =

Police department of Jammu and Kashmir, India

- Patch of the Jammu and Kashmir Police

- Logo of the Jammu and Kashmir Police
- Common name: JK Police
- Abbreviation: JKP
- Motto: A Saga of Sacrifice and Courage

Agency overview
- Formed: 1873; 153 years ago
- Employees: 83,000
- Annual budget: ₹9,925.50 crore (US$1.1 billion) (2026–27)

Jurisdictional structure
- Operations jurisdiction: Jammu and Kashmir, India
- Map of the Jammu and Kashmir Police's jurisdiction (lighter shade denotes claimed but not controlled areas)
- Area: 85,806 square miles (222,240 km^{2})
- Population: 12,548,926
- Legal jurisdiction: Jammu and Kashmir
- General nature: Local civilian police

Operational structure
- Headquarters: Peer Bagh, Srinagar (May–October); Gulshan Ground, Jammu (November–April)
- Elected officer responsible: Amit Shah, Ministry of Home Affairs
- Agency executive: Nalin Prabhat, IPS, Director General of Police
- Parent agency: Government of Jammu & Kashmir
- Units: List: Jammu & Kashmir Armed Police; Jammu & Kashmir Traffic Police; Crime Branch, J&K Police; Jammu & Kashmir Railway Police; Special Operations Group; Technical Wing; Security Wing; CID Wing; Counter-Intelligence Wing; Civil Defense, Home Guard & SDRF
- Districts: List: Jammu; Kathua; Samba; Udhampur; Reasi; Rajouri; Poonch; Doda; Ramban; Kishtwar; Srinagar; Anantnag; Kulgam; Pulwama; Awantipora; Shopian; Budgam; Ganderbal; Bandipora; Baramulla; Sopore; Kupwara; Handwara

Website
- jkpolice.gov.in

The Jammu and Kashmir Police is the police force of Indian union territory of Jammu and Kashmir. JKP was established in 1873 and has primary responsibilities in law enforcement and investigation within Jammu and Kashmir.

== History ==
The first specific Jammu & Kashmir police force came into existence in the year 1873 with one police officer known as Kotwal and 14 Thanedars for Srinagar City. This police force would control crime and take care of law and order situations with help of Chowkidars and Harkars, who were paid mandatorily by the residents of Imperial Kashmir Union.

It was in 1913 that the state requisitioned the service of an Imperial Police (IP) officer on deputation and appointed Mr Broadway as the first Inspector General of Police in June, 1913. He continued to be Police chief up to 1917 and was followed by other IP officers.

Since then the Police in J&K has undergone several re-organizations, The employee strength of Police in J&K in the year 1889-90 was 1040, which further rose to 1570 in the year 1903 and forty years later, in 1943–44, the strength of J&K Police was 3179 and at present it has exceeded 83000 mark.

== Organizational structure ==
Jammu and Kashmir Police is administratively managed by the UT’s Home Department under the supervision of the Lieutenant Governor of Jammu and Kashmir. Operational leadership is provided by the Director General of Police appointed by the Ministry of Home Affairs (MHA). MHA also determines the budget of the J&K police.

The current Director General of Police in Jammu and Kashmir is Nalin Prabhat who took over as the 18th DGP of Jammu & Kashmir on 1 October 2024 from Rashmi Ranjan Swain who served as DGP of the state from November 2023 to September 2024. Rashmi Ranjan Swain is a 1991-batch Indian Police Service officer of the AGMUT cadre. During his tenure, the Jammu and Kashmir Police launched the online grievance redressal portal Awaam Se, Awaam Ke Liye on 1 January 2024.

== Special agencies ==
- Intelligence Unit (Crime Branch)
- Special Operations Group

== Hierarchy ==
Officers

- Director General of Police (DGP)
- Additional Director General of Police (Addl.DGP)
- Inspector General of Police (IGP)
- Deputy Inspector General of Police (DIG)
- Senior Superintendent of Police (SSP)
- Superintendent of Police (SP)
- Additional Superintendent of Police(Addl.SP)
- Assistant Superintendent of Police (ASP)
- Deputy Superintendent of Police (DSP)

Sub-ordinates

- Inspector
- Sub-Inspector (SI)
- Assistant Sub-Inspector (ASI)
- Head Constable (HC)
- Selection Grade Constable
- Constable
- Follower
- Special Police Official (SPO)

=== Insignia ===
Indian Police Service cadre officers rank insignia
Insignia
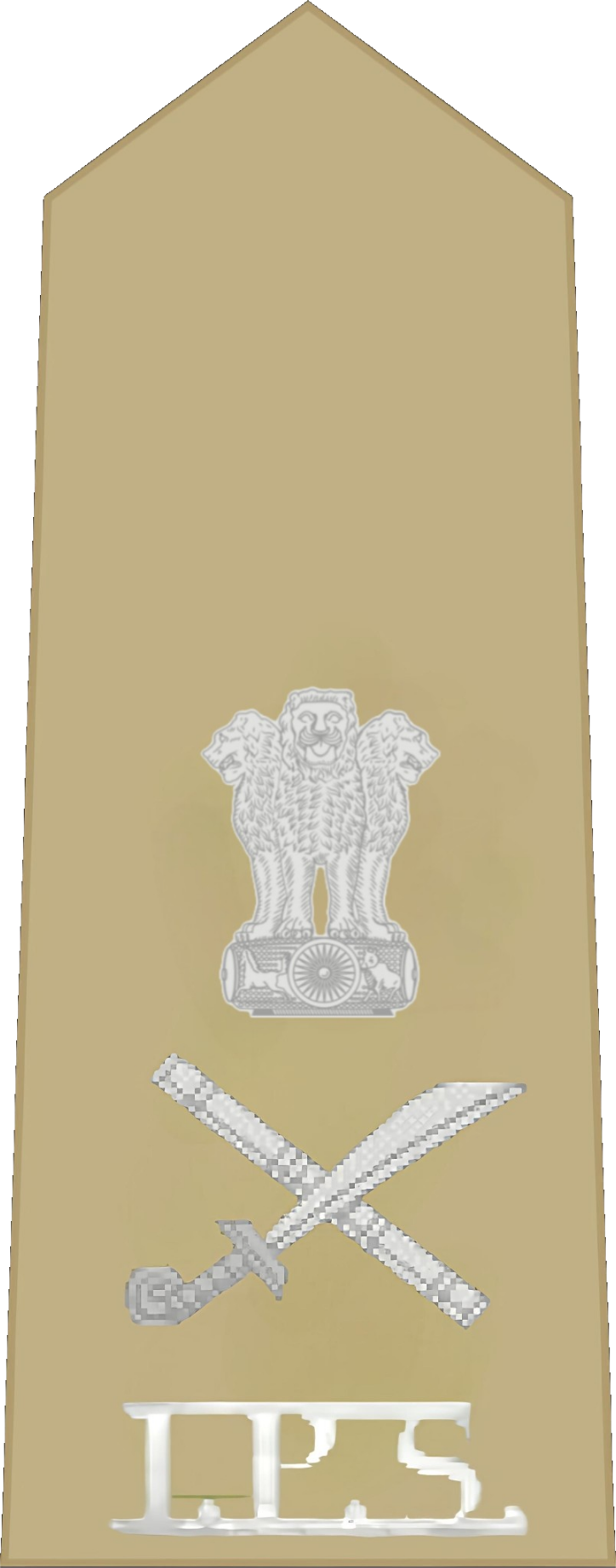
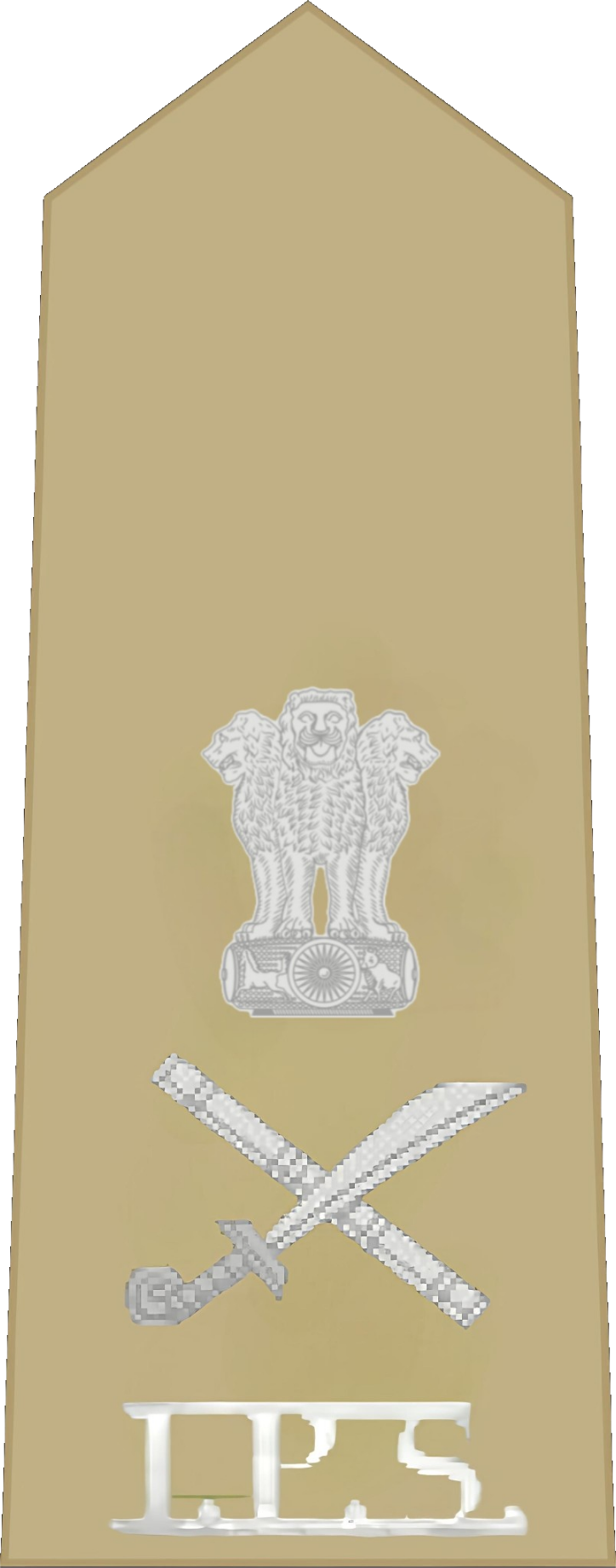
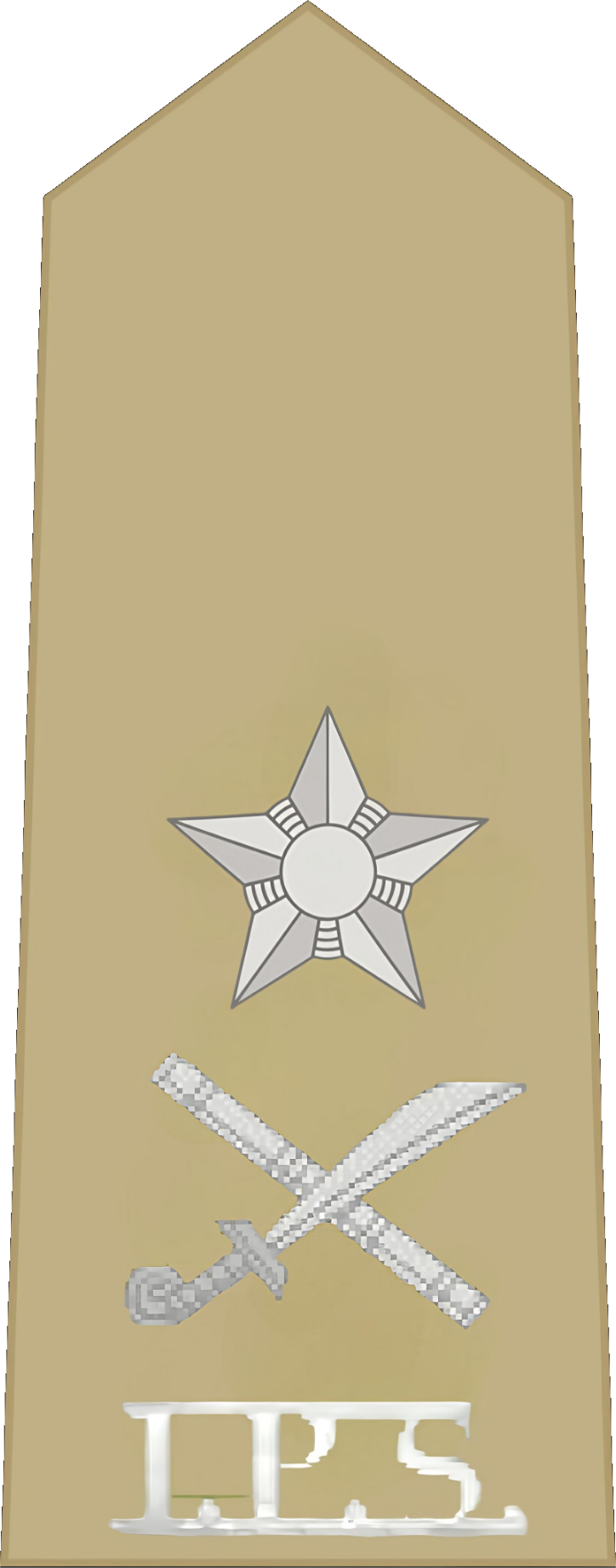
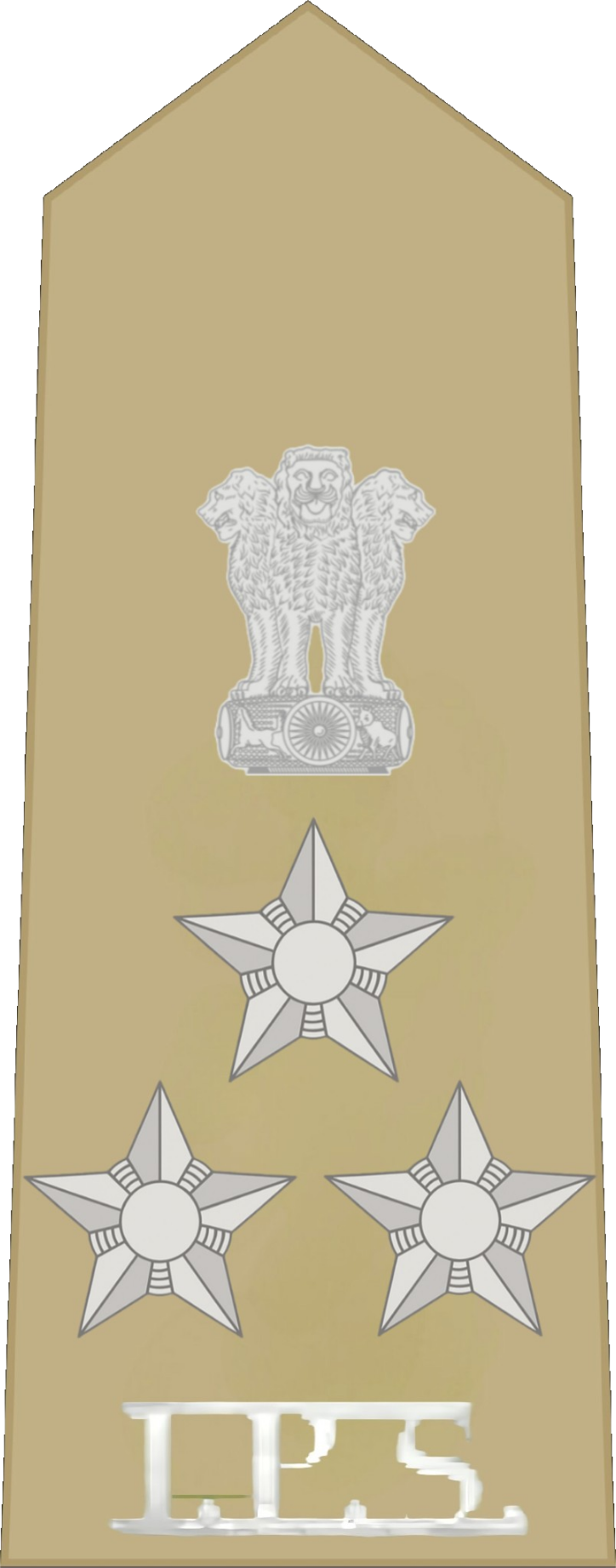
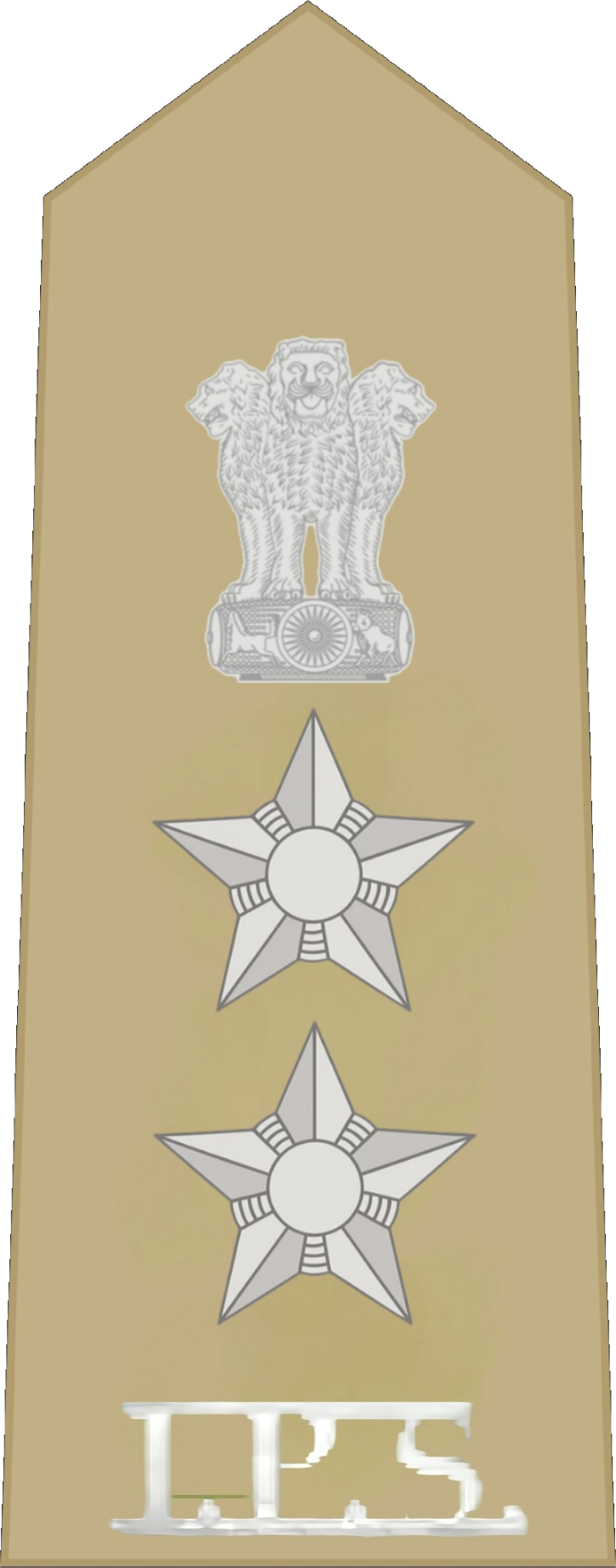
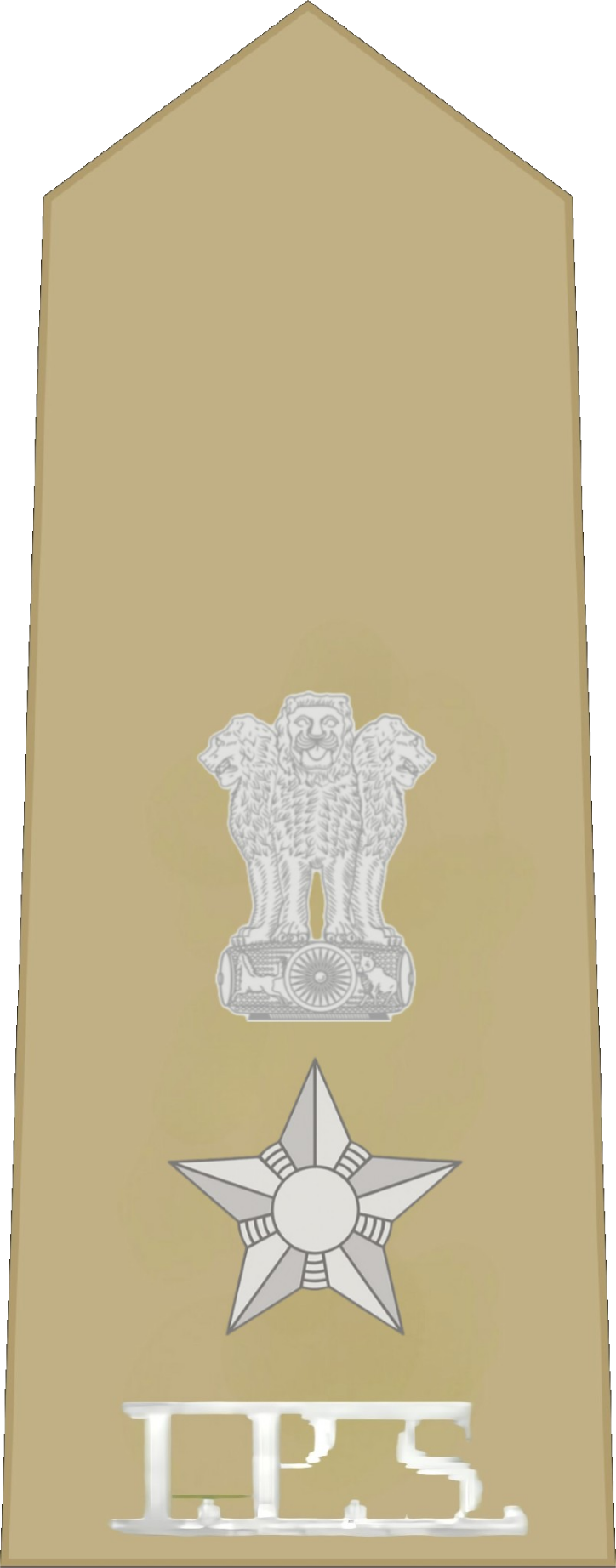
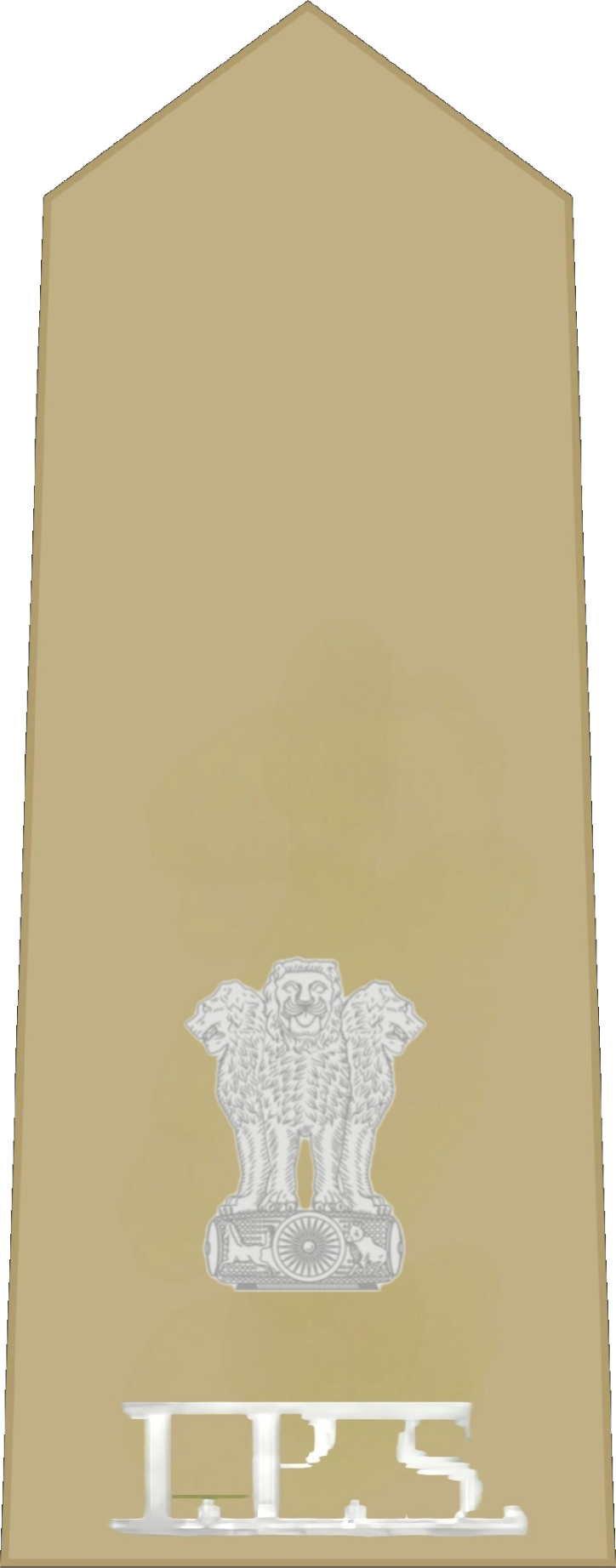
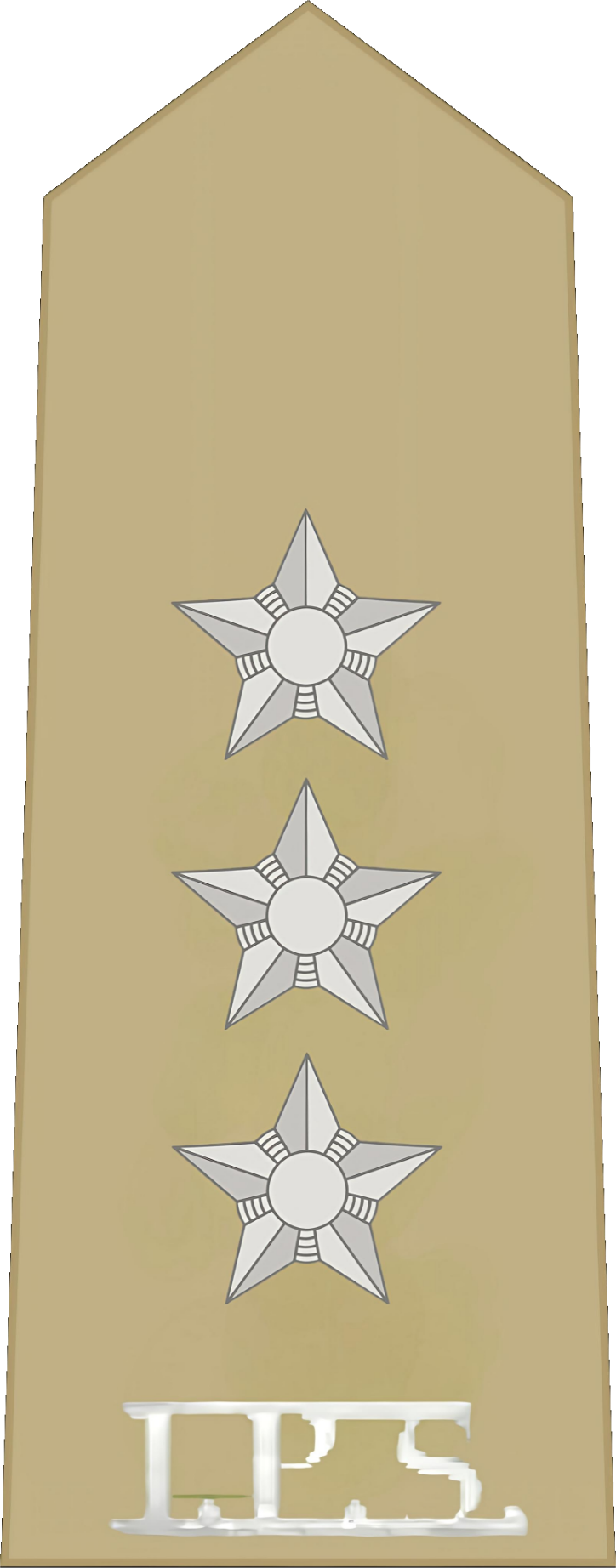
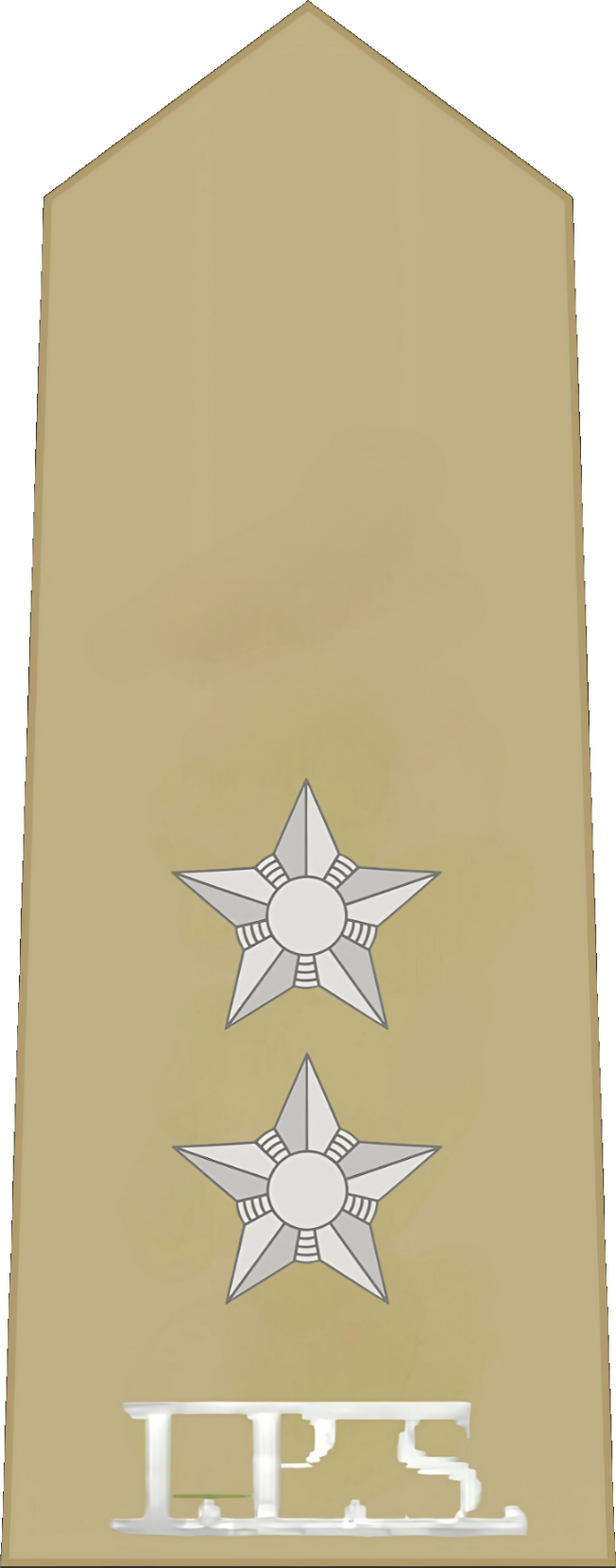
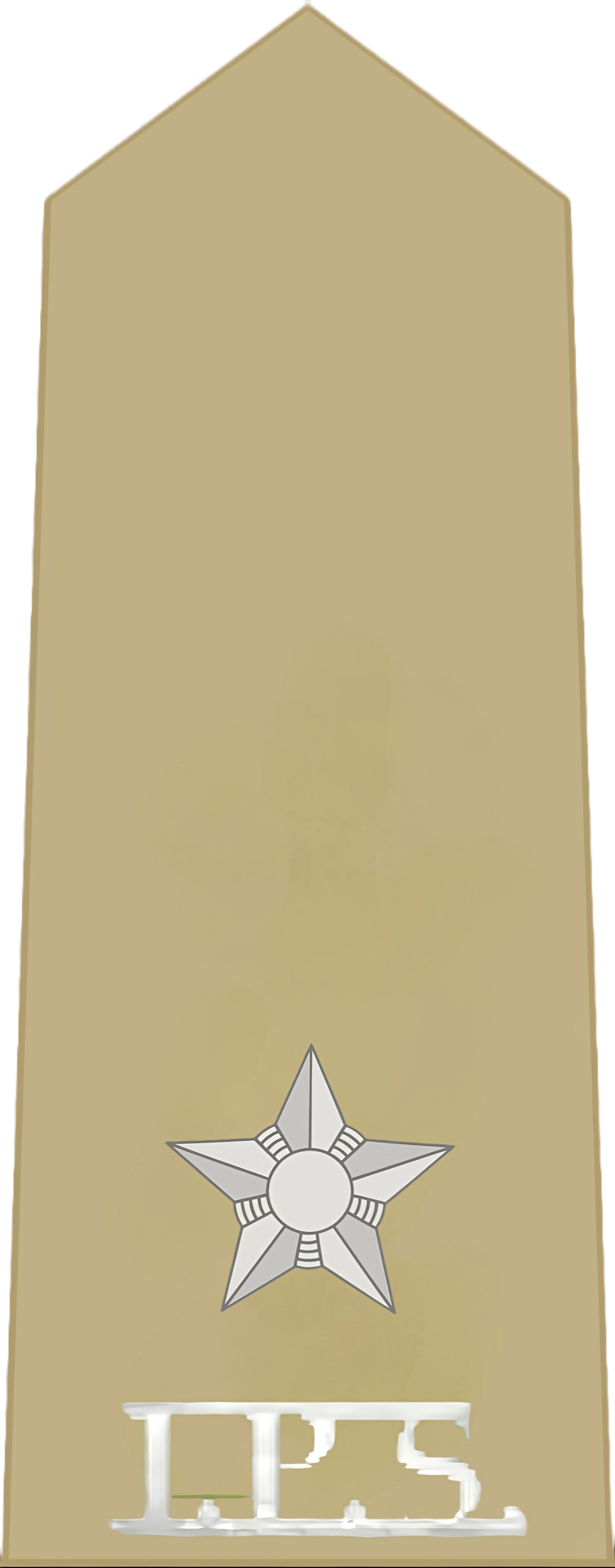
Rank
Director General of Police
Additional Director General of Police (Note: Rank insignia of DGP is similar to Additional DGP.)
Inspector General of Police
Deputy Inspector General of Police
Superintendent of Police (Selection Grade) (Note: The Senior Superintendent of Police (SSP) is a post, not a rank, typically held by an SP (selection grade or junior grade) in states like Uttar Pradesh, Jammu and Kashmir, and Punjab.)
Superintendent of Police
Additional superintendent of police
Assistant Superintendent of Police
Assistant superintendent of police (Probationary for two years)
Assistant Superintendent of Police (Probationary for one year)
Abbreviation
DGP
ADGP
IGP
DIGP
SP (SG)
SP
Addl.SP
ASP
ASP
ASP

- Note 1: The rank insignia of DGP, Spl.DGP, Addl.DGP is the same.
- Note 2: The equivalent rank to the ASP (Asst.SP) in State Police Services is the deputy superintendent of police (DSP/DySP).
- Note 3: The commissioner of police is a post typically held by DIG and above rank officers.

Indian Police non-gazetted officers rank insignia
Insignia
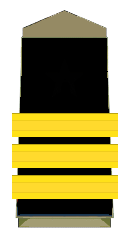
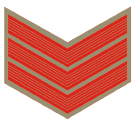
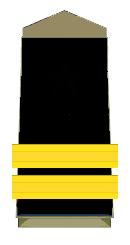
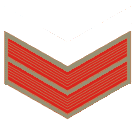
No insignia
Rank
Inspector of Police
Inspector / Circle Inspector (Note: Inspector or Circle Inspector with One Five-Pointed Star insignia exists in West Bengal Police.)
Assistant Police Inspector (Note: This rank exists only in the Maharashtra Police.)
Sub-Inspector
Sergeant (Kolkata Police)
Assistant Sub-Inspector
Head Constable (Note: Shoulder insignia rank only used in the Maharashtra Police.)
Senior Constable (Note: This rank is also known as senior constable, constable grade-I, and exists only in some state police forces.)
Police constable
Abbreviation
INSP
INSP / CO
API
SI
Sgt
ASI
HC
SC
PC

- The rank of Sergeant is used in India only in the Bihar Police and the Kolkata Police
- The One Five Pointed Star for the rank of Inspector is used by Police forces of 7 states viz. West Bengal, Jharkhand, Bihar, Sikkim, Assam, Nagaland and Tripura. This is because Inspectors of Police in these 7 states are Gazetted Officers. However, the Kolkata Police uses the Four Pointed Star of the Order of Bath for the ranks of Inspector and Assistant Commissioner of Police instead of Five Pointed Star. For the ranks of ASI, SI/Sergeant and Deputy Commissioner of Police, the usual Five Pointed Star is used
- Colour pattern and size of chevrons may vary according to the different rules of several distinct Indian State Police services.

== Gallantry Awards ==
In the wake of the insurgency, the J&K police participate in many operations against terrorists in joint coordination with the armed forces. In those operations many policemen laid down their lives. Some of them got Peace time gallantry awards. Assistant Sub Inspector Babu Ram, DySP Himayun Muzammil Bhat, Constable Altaf Hussain Bhat, DySP Aman Kumar Thakur, Special Police Officer Bilal Ahmad Magray and Special Police Officer Shahbaz Ahmad have been posthumously awarded Ashok Chakra, Kirti Chakra and Shaurya Chakra, respectively. These are the three highest peacetime gallantry awards, given for showing exemplary courage in service of the nation

== Notable achievements ==
On the occasion of 75 years of India's independence, Jammu Kashmir Police received 108 gallantry medals, which was highest among all Indian states. J&K Police cornered 62% of awards for In 2021 Jammu Kashmir Police became the first to win all three highest gallantry awards in India, viz Ashok Chakra, Kirti Chakra and Shaurya Chakra.

== Controversies ==
Jammu Kashmir Police has been accused of wrongly discharging criminals and failure to track its own police personnel in the past.

== Gallery ==
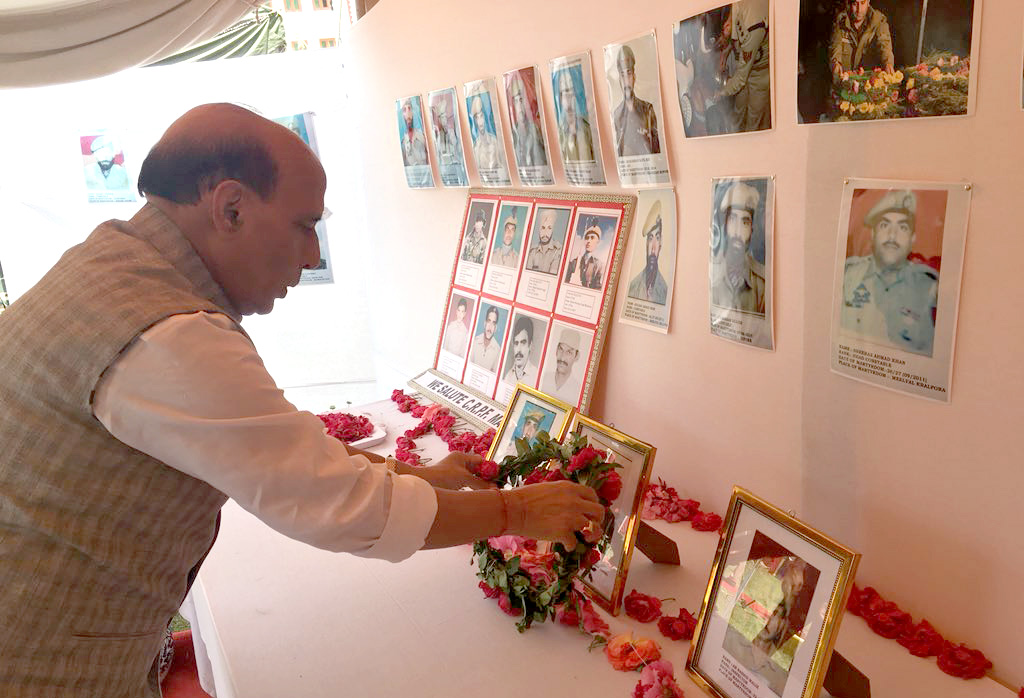
Union Home Minister paying tributes to the fallen officers of Jammu & Kashmir Police in 2018, Kupwara.

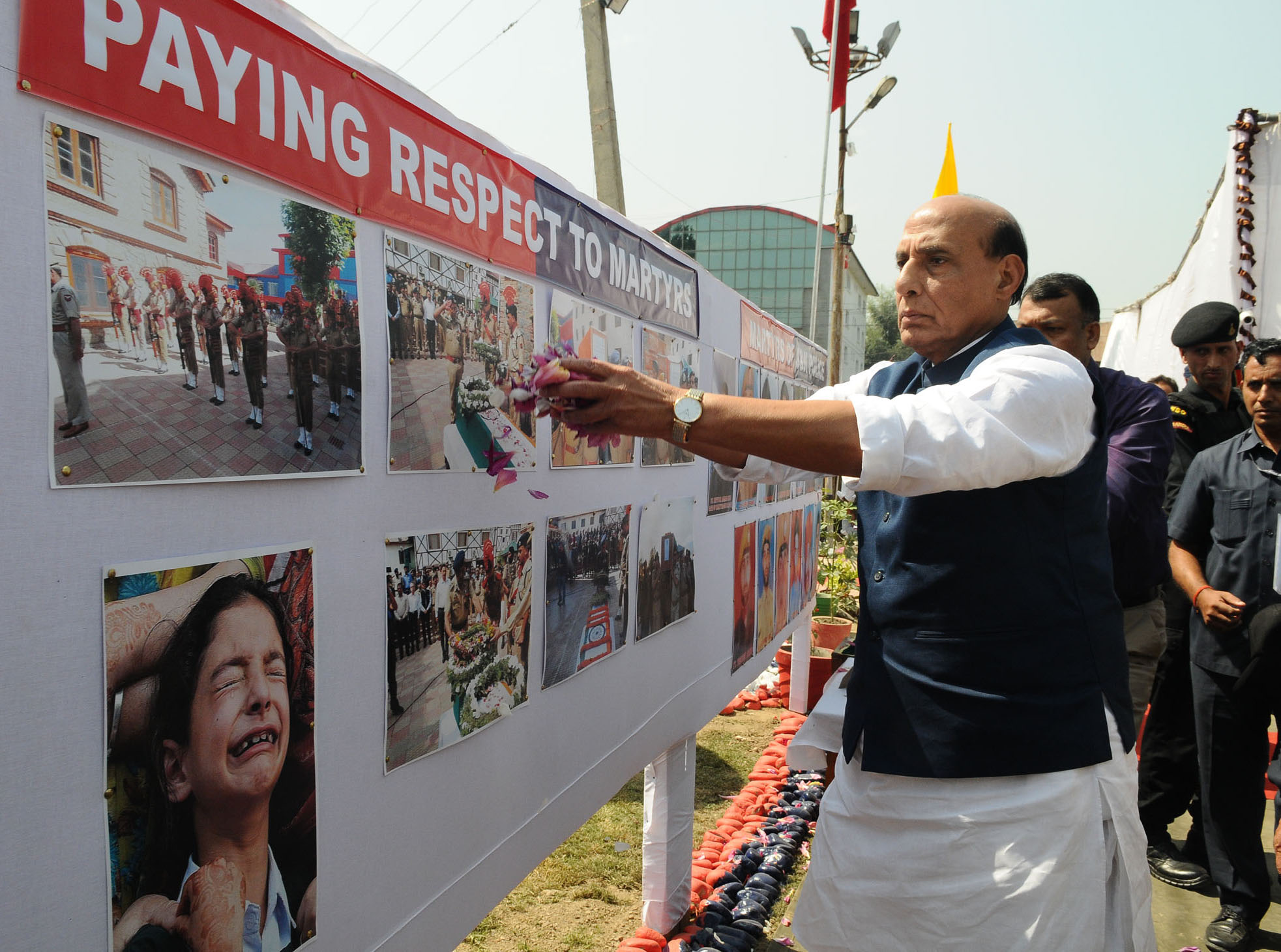
Union Home Minister paying floral tributes to fallen officers, during his visit to the Jammu and Kashmir Police Lines, in Anantnag district, 2017

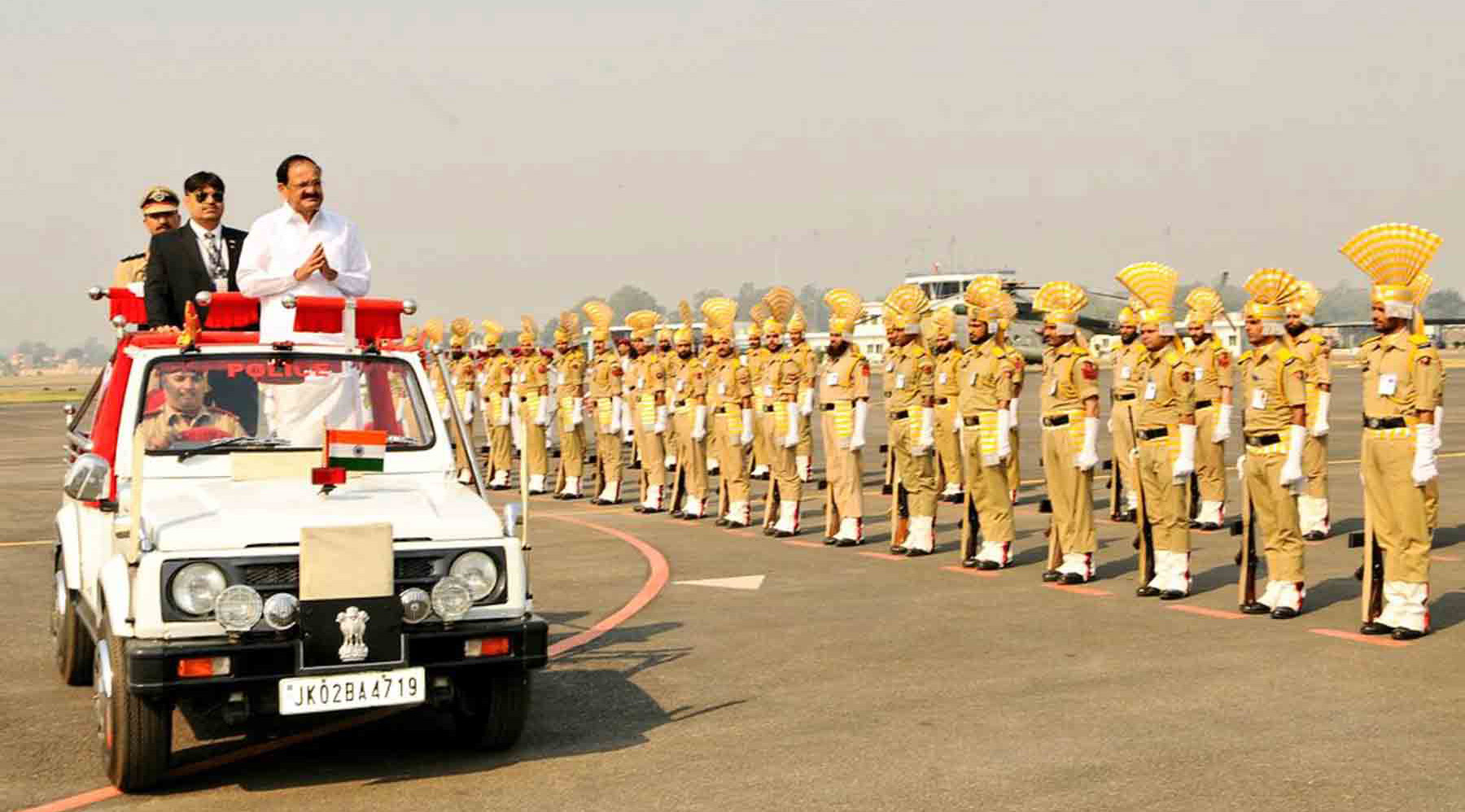
The Vice President inspecting the guard of honour

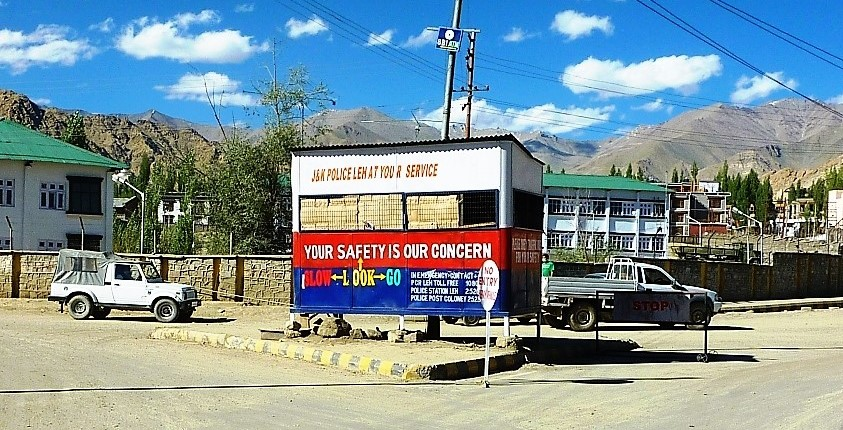
A JKP outpost in Ladakh

== See also ==
- Law enforcement in India
- Ladakh Police
