= 37 mm caliber =

37 mm gun or 3.7 cm gun can refer to several weapons or weapons systems. The "37 mm" refers to the inside diameter of the barrel of the gun, and therefore the diameter of the projectile it fires. However, the overall size and power of the gun itself can vary greatly between different weapons, in spite of them all being called "37 mm" guns.

- The 37 mm version of the Maxim gun used by both sides during World War I
  - QF 1 pounder pom-pom, the British version
- 37 mm automatic air defense gun M1939 (61-K), a Soviet World War II anti-aircraft gun
- 37 mm anti-tank gun M1930 (1-K), a Soviet World War II anti-tank gun
- 37 mm Gun M1, an American World War II anti-aircraft gun
- 37 mm Gun M3, an American World War II anti-tank gun
- 3.7 cm Flak 18/36/37/43, a German World War II anti-aircraft gun
- 3.7 cm PaK 36, a German World War II gun
- 3.7 cm SK C/30, a German World War II naval anti-aircraft gun
- ARWEN 37, a less than lethal riot launcher
- ARWEN ACE, a less than lethal riot launcher
- BK 3,7, a German World War II airborne anti-tank gun
- Bofors 37 mm, a Swedish designed anti-tank gun
- Cannone-Mitragliera da 37/54 (Breda), an Italian World War II naval anti-aircraft gun
- Canon de 37 mm Modèle 1925, a French World War II naval anti-aircraft gun
- Canon d'Infanterie de 37 modèle 1916 TRP, a French World War I gun; In US World War I service known as the 37mm M1916
- COW 37 mm gun, a British World War II airborne anti-tank gun
- DEFTEC 37mm launcher
- DEFTEC 1315
- DEFTEC L8
- DEFTEC LMT
- M4 cannon, an American World War II aircraft auto-cannon, offensive and defensive applications
- Milkor Stopper 37/38 mm riot gun, a riot gun
- Nudelman N-37, a Soviet airborne auto-cannon
- Nudelman-Suranov NS-37, a Soviet World War II airborne anti-tank auto-cannon
- Puteaux SA 18, a French semi-automatic gun mounted on armored vehicles and in bunkers used during and after World War I
- Skoda 37 mm A7, a Czech World War II gun
- Skoda 37 mm Model 1934, a World War II gun
- Skoda 37 mm Model 1937, a World War II gun
- Type 11 37 mm infantry gun, a World War II Japanese infantry support gun
- Type 1 37 mm anti-tank gun, a World War II Japanese anti-tank gun
- 37 mm trench gun M1915, a World War I Russian gun
- 37 mm flare, grenade launcher system
- 3.7 cm ÚV vz. 38
