= Hamilton Police Service =

Police service of Hamilton

- Patch (Shoulder Flash) & Logo of Hamilton Police Service

- Official Heraldic Badge granted by Canadian Heraldic Authority
- Motto: Together. Stronger. Safer.

Agency overview
- Formed: March 11, 1833 (original); January 1st, 2001 (current HPS)

Jurisdictional structure
- Operations jurisdiction: Canada
- Legal jurisdiction: Hamilton, Ontario
- Governing body: City of Hamilton Police Services Board
- Constituting instrument: Police Services Act

Operational structure
- Headquarters: 155 King William Street; Hamilton, Ontario, Canada; L8N 4C1
- Sworn members: 829
- Unsworn members: 414
- Elected officer responsible: Hon. Michael Kerzner, Solicitor General of Ontario
- Agency executive: Frank Bergen, Chief of Police May 7, 2021 — Present

Facilities
- Station / Divisions: 3

Website
- hamiltonpolice.on.ca

The Hamilton Police Service (HPS) is the police service of the city of Hamilton, Ontario, Canada. As of 2021, the service employed 829 sworn officers and 414 non-sworn staff, serving a population of about 570 000 residents. The service's headquarters are located at 155 King William St., Hamilton, Ontario. As of 2022, the service's budget is $183 542 539, roughly 18.5% of the City's overall budget. It is one of the oldest police forces in Ontario.

== History ==
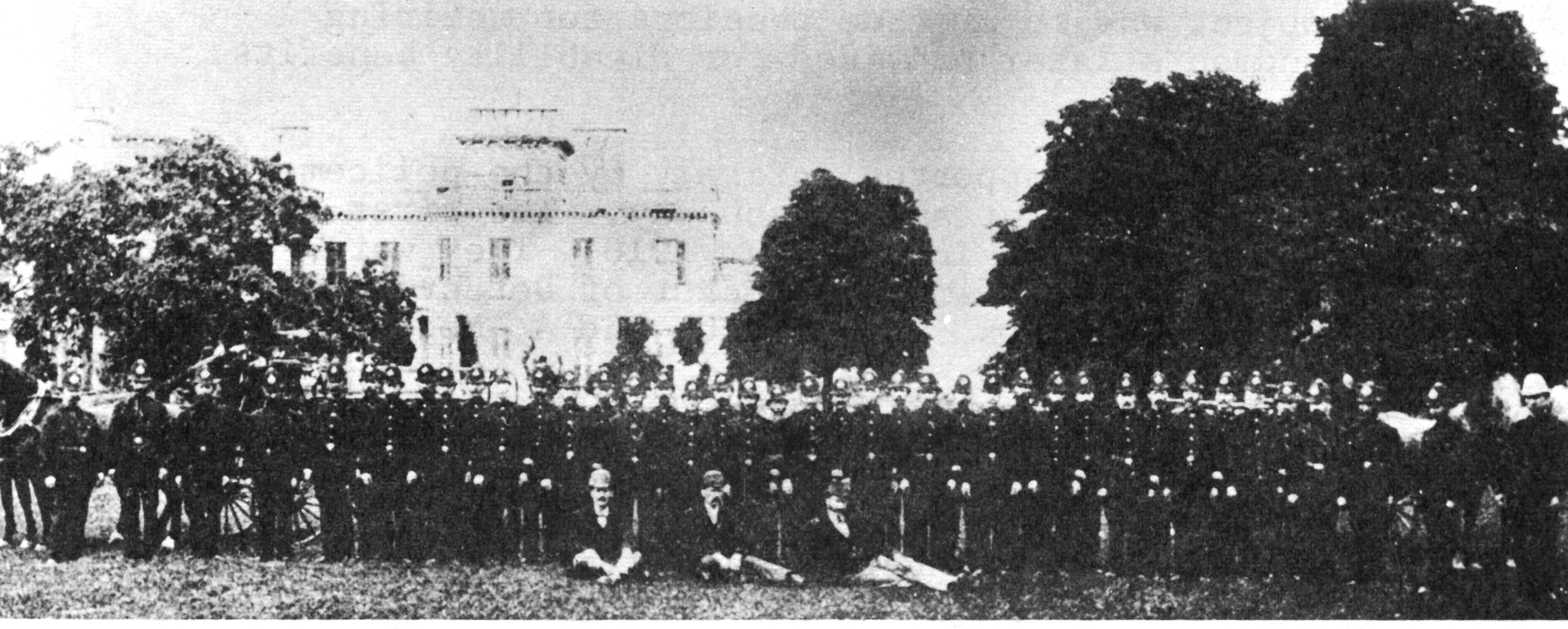
Photo of the Hamilton Police Force posing in front of Dundurn Castle in 1889.

The Town of Hamilton was incorporated by Upper Canadian Parliament on February 13, 1833. On March 11 of that year, High Bailiff John Ryckman was appointed as Hamilton's first police officer. In 1829, Sir Robert Peel established the Metropolitan Police Force in London, England, based at Scotland Yard. These 1,000 constables were the world’s first police officers. They were nicknamed ‘Bobbies’ or “Peelers” and were the direct forerunners of today’s modern policing.

In March 1833, only four years later, policing was established in the Town of Hamilton – one of the first Canadian communities to adopt Peel’s concept. On Monday March 11, 1833 at the first meeting of the Board of Police (a forerunner of today’s City Council), John Ryckman was appointed as High Bailiff. For a time, the High Bailiff led a handful of volunteers who served to enforce the law in Hamilton. In 1846, the town of Hamilton received its Charter and the City was incorporated. At this time the Police Department became a professional paid organization. Samuel L. Ryckman, who was the High Bailiff at the time, became Chief Constable.

In 1848 the Town of Dundas created its own police agency. In 1850, the Police Village of Ancaster followed suit in creating a police department. In 1867, Confederation occurred, establishing Canada as a country. In 1868, The Dominion Police Force, a federal police force, was established and worked mainly in Ottawa and eastern Canada. In 1873 the North West Mounted Police (later RCMP) was formed. After the Second World War, the Dominion Police was absorbed into the Royal Canadian Mounted Police (RCMP).

As of at least 1883, the Wentworth County Constabulary was established and patrolled areas surrounding Hamilton and Barton, including the rest of Gore District. Wentworth County included the Townships of Ancaster, Barton, Beverly, Binbrook, East Flamboro, Glanford, Saltfleet, West Flamboro, Dundas and Waterdown and would have provided policing in areas listed that did not already have a Police Force. The Ontario Provincial Police were formed on October 13, 1909 and at various points took over some policing areas formerly under Wentworth County.

In August 1940, the Township of Saltfleet established a constabulary to patrol its increasingly urban territory, taking over from the Ontario Provincial Police. They may have also looked after the village of Stoney Creek by special agreement, until 1949. In 1949 Stoney Creek established its own police department in the wake of the post-war boom.

At some point, the Township of Glanbrook also established a police department. Other area police departments appear to have included Barton Township, Glanford Township (which may have been very short-lived), Flamborough, East Flamborough (disbanded in 1957 when the City of Burlington annexed Aldershot), Waterdown (est 1948, taken over by the OPP in 1967 when the two man force resigned), Hamilton Cemetery, Hamilton Beach, Hamilton Harbour Police, and Hamilton Parks Police (disbanded in August, 1963) which had the distinction of having Canada’s only one-armed Chief.

Over the years, many of these small departments vanished. Their territory was either taken over by the Ontario Provincial Police, or they amalgamated with other departments as municipalities merged or entered into joint agreements.

In the 1960s, the provincial government removed policing from direct municipal control by establishing independent Police Commissions. Policing was no longer a ‘department’ of city hall.

On December 31, 1973, there were only five departments remaining, including Hamilton, Stoney Creek, Ancaster, Dundas, and Saltfleet. On January 1, 1974, they were all disbanded, and merged into one Hamilton-Wentworth Regional Police Force. Glanbrook, Flamborough and Waterdown were taken over by HWRP from the OPP in 1977.

On February 22, 1986, the Hamilton Harbour Police, an unarmed special police under the jurisdiction of the Hamilton Harbour Commission, was disbanded and its duties were assumed by the Hamilton-Wentworth Regional Police Force.

On January 1, 2001, the communities of, Ancaster, Dundas, Flamborough, Stoney Creek, Glanbrook Township and Hamilton were merged along with the Regional Municipality of Hamilton-Wentworth into the new City of Hamilton. The former Hamilton-Wentworth Regional Police Service became an amalgamated Hamilton Police Service.

The Hamilton Police Service patrols an area of 1138 square kilometres, containing a population of 776,000.

== Badge, Flag and Logo ==
=== Hamilton Police Service Badge ===
The Hamilton Police Service Heraldic badge and Flag were granted by the Canadian Heraldic Authority (created by Her Majesty the Queen Elizabeth II on the recommendation of His Excellency the Governor General of Canada) November 15, 2007. The coat of arms is a version of the national Police Badge for municipal police services. It may be granted to any municipal police service which is part of a municipal corporation that possesses a coat of arms by lawful grant from the Crown. All such badges share a frame of gold maple leaves rising up from a representation of the provincial flower from the province in which the service is sited, all ensigned by the Canadian Royal Crown.

"On a hurt a maple leaf gules fimbriated or, all within a wreath of maple leaves or issuant from a trillium flower proper between two cinquefoils gules, the whole ensigned by the Royal Crown proper and in base a ribbon sable edged or inscribed Hamilton Police Service in letters argent;"

==== Symbolism ====
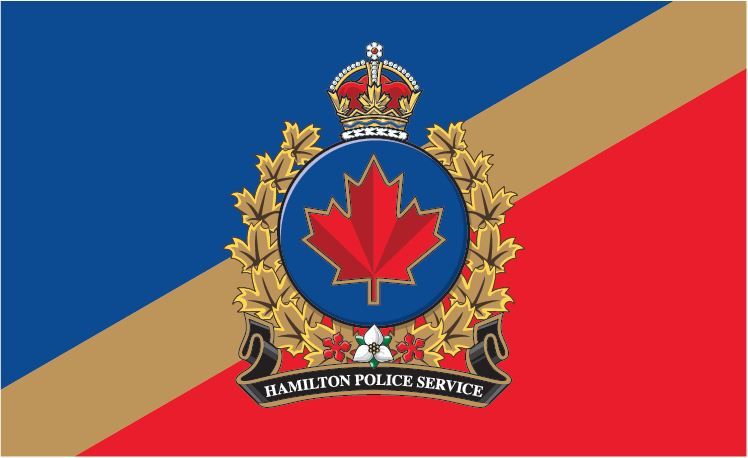
Official Flag of the Hamilton Police Service

There are many symbolic meanings to various parts of the Hamilton Police Service Badge. The exterior frame of maple leaves, the trillium, and Canadian Royal Crown follow the traditional style of police badges for a municipal police service in Canada. The police service has the responsibility of upholding the peace and the administration of justice under the Canadian Crown. The Royal Crown, at the top of the coat of arms, symbolizes the administration of Crown’s justice, while the laurel of maple leaves and trillium refer to Canada and Ontario respectively. The blue field represents the harbour of the City of Hamilton and the gold edges represent the city’s industry and wealth. The red maple leaf represents Canada. The two cinquefoils allude to the arms of the City of Hamilton in which such a cinquefoil also appears. The cinquefoil is taken from the arms of the Chief of Clan Hamilton, and it thus refers to the city's namesake. The coat of arms is included in the Public Register of Arms, Flags and Badges of Canada.

=== Flag ===
"Per bend sinister azure and gules a bend sinister or overall the badge;"

The symbolism of this emblem is found in other elements of this record

=== Logo ===
The logo, similar to the heraldic crest, was developed by a police committee when the Hamilton-Wentworth Regional Police became the Hamilton Police Service. It is the logo that appears on marked patrol vehicles, signage, letterhead, etc.

- banner with the words HAMILTON POLICE
  - maple leaf: while representing Canada, the leaf has six facets, representing the six municipalities that formed the Hamilton-Wentworth Region (1974) and then later the amalgamated City of Hamilton (2001). Those municipalities in addition to Hamilton are Ancaster, Dundas, Flamborough, Glanbrook and Stoney Creek.
- wreath of golden maple leaves
  - waves - representing the connection of the city to Lake Ontario and Hamilton Harbour

The blue oval at the top of the red maple leaf represents the Hamilton Harbour, the six veins of the red maple leaf represent the six former municipalities, the veins of the leaf extending into the blue oval illustrate inclusiveness of the community, the gold trim around the maple leaf represents the wealth of industry, natural resources, business and community partnerships, the two blue waves at the bottom of the leaf represent the vision to be the best and most progressive police service.

== Organization ==
=== Police services board ===
Like all municipalities in Ontario, the City of Hamilton maintains a police services board, responsible for overseeing policing services in the City. The board approves the police budget, hires the chief and deputy chiefs of police directly, and is the legal employer of every Hamilton Police employee. Although the board sets overall service policy and direction, it has no operational control over the service or its officers, and day-to-day policing decisions are the exclusive jurisdiction of the police chief.

The board is composed of seven members: the mayor (or their designate); two city councillors; one member of the public appointed by city council; and three members of the public appointed by the province. As of 2024, it consisted of:

Name	Position	Appointed by
Pat Mandy	Chair	Provincial Appointee
Fred Bennink	Vice-chair	Provincial Appointee
Andrea Horwath	Member	Hamilton City Council member
Geordie Elms	Member	Provincial Appointee
Cameron Kroetsch	Member	Hamilton City Council member
Esther Pauls	Member	Hamilton City Council member
Anjali Menezes	Member	Municipal Appointee

==== Special constabularies ====
In addition to maintaining the Hamilton Police Service, the Board is responsible for approving and overseeing special constabularies that operate in the City. Currently, there is only one special constabulary operating in the City of Hamilton that falls under the jurisdiction of the Board, the McMaster University Campus Security Service.

Historically, the Board was responsible for two other special constabularies in Hamilton: the Harbour Police and Parks Police. The Parks Police force was disbanded in 1963, in response to union-mandated wage hikes, while the Harbour Police force was amalgamated into the Hamilton-Wentworth Regional Police Force in 1986.

=== Rank structure ===
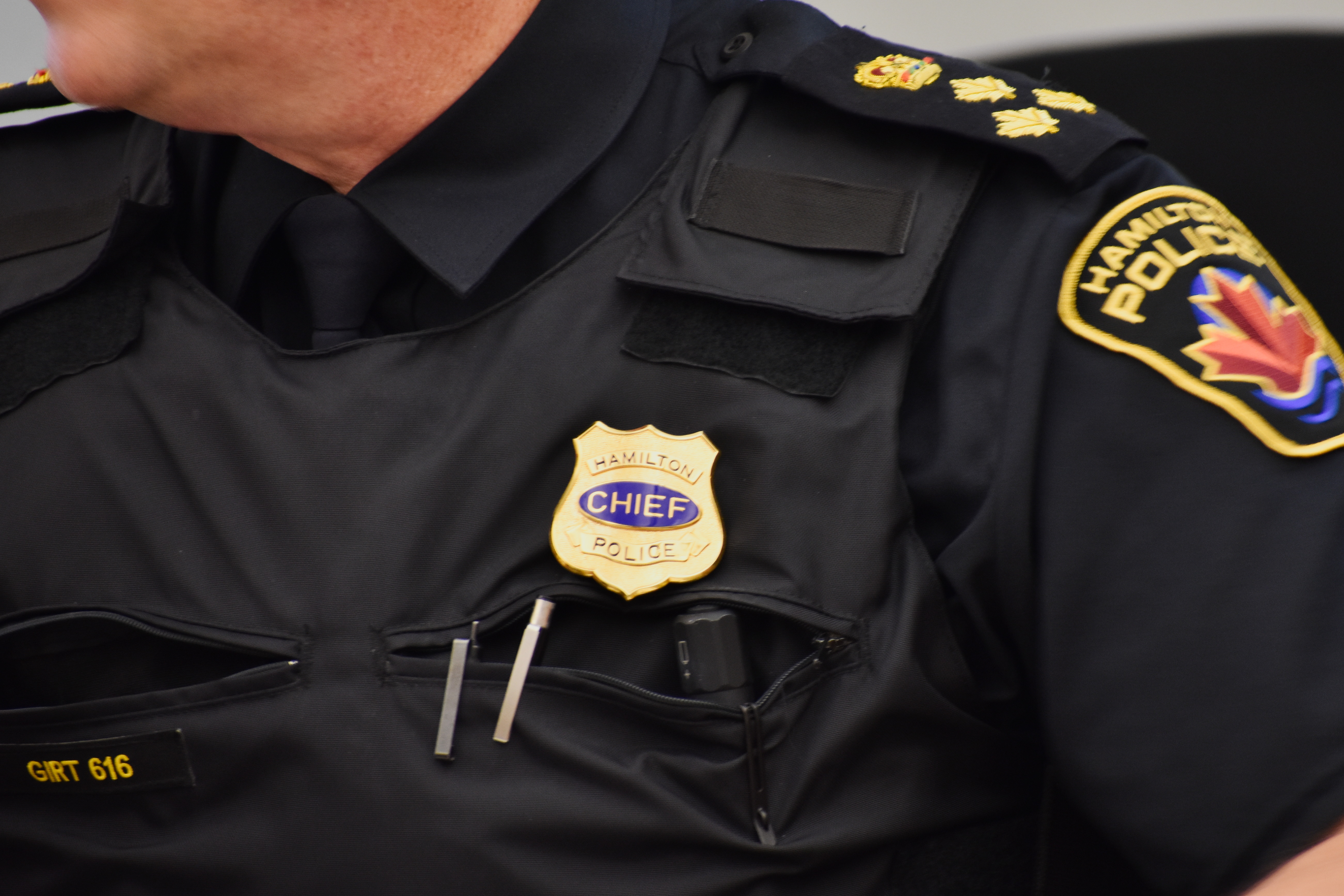
Hamilton's distinctive badge and slip-on epaulettes, as worn by former Chief of Police Eric Girt.

Rank	Commanding officers		Senior officers				Police officers
Rank	Chief of police	Deputy chief of police	Superintendent	Inspector	Staff sergeant	Sergeant	Constable
Insignia (slip-on)							
Insignia (shoulder board)					Shoulder boards not used for these ranks		

Criminal investigators for the Hamilton Police hold the ranks of Detective Constable and Detective Sergeant which are equivalent to Sergeant and Staff Sergeant, respectively.

Unlike other Ontario police services, all Hamilton Police officers wear shields on their chest. Members at the rank of Sergeant and above have their rank listed on the badge in a blue oval, and members at the rank of Inspector and above have gold shields.

=== Divisions ===
The Hamilton Police Service operates out of three police stations: Central, which covers the northwestern portion of the old City of Hamilton; East End, which covers the southeastern portion of the old City of Hamilton and the entirety of the old Town of Stoney Creek; and Mountain, which covers the remainder of the amalgamated City of Hamilton.

=== Specialized units ===
==== Auxiliary police unit ====
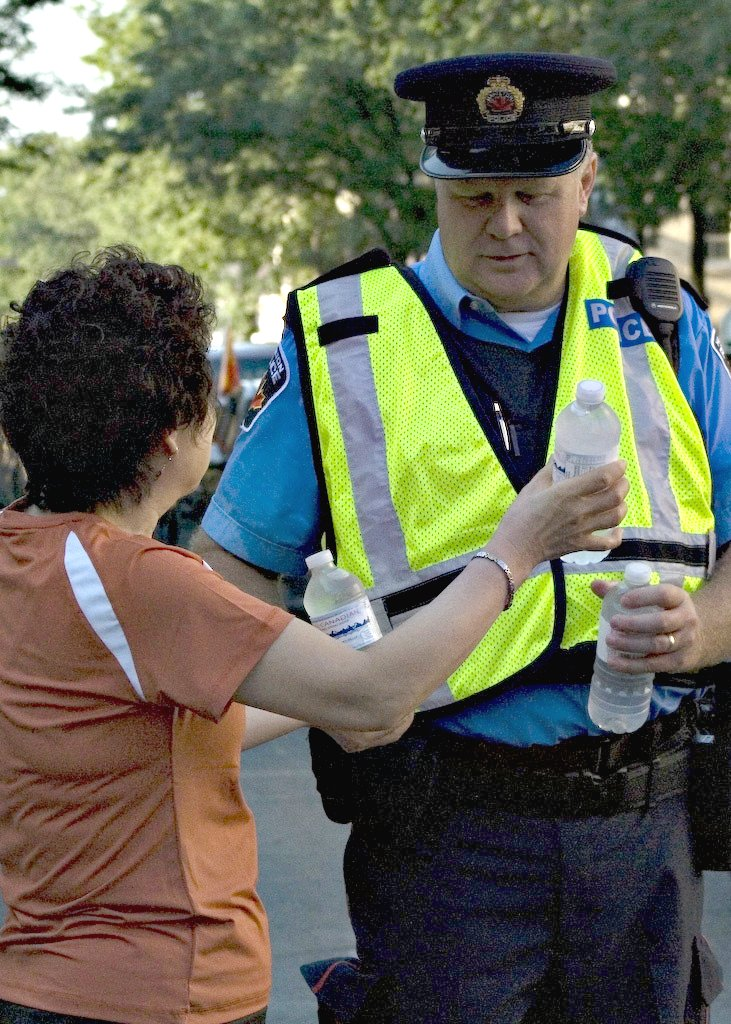
A Hamilton Police Auxiliary Constable receives water from a local storeowner on a hot summer's evening.

The auxiliary police were established in the early 1960s as a response to societal changes. Civil unrest throughout the world had the police service question its ability to deal with large-scale chaos. The principal goal was to create an auxiliary force made up of volunteer, unpaid officers who could be called upon to assist the regular force if problems were ever to arise. The auxiliary police are required to go through various training seminars, as well as maintain a high degree of physical fitness. Although in uniform, they function under very strict guidelines and do not substitute for regular officers. Instead, they assist in the processes when constables required a large, organized support.

The auxiliary police work at parades or during long weekends, at rallies, or large events where police presence is required on a larger scale than usual. They are identified with a shoulder flash that says 'auxiliary'. They also wear a traditional light-blue shirt whereas sworn officers wear navy blue uniforms.

==== Canine ====
The first known record of dogs being used in policing the Hamilton community was in 1878, when an old stray dog the officers named "Bob" was taken in and routinely brought on night patrol to accompany an officer named Constable Ferris on his beat. Bob was not trained for special tasks, but often acted as a deterrent to those who had the potential to create trouble.

In 1960 the Hamilton Police Department acquired two dogs with the intent of training them for special circumstances. Hamilton Police had the second municipal canine unit in Canada. Their names were Sandy and King. The dogs were used for many functions which made the officers’ jobs safer and easier. Due to their keen senses, dogs were trained to track suspects or missing persons, search buildings, and to locate weapons and bombs. They were also trained to disarm criminals threatening the life of an officer. The dogs used as police dogs were for the most part German Shepherds. They are used because of their fierce loyalty, relatively even temperament, imposing physical presence and easy trainability.

The dogs train with a constable who is responsible for the dog both on and off the job. They live with officers' families which allows a constant relationship between the dogs and their handlers to develop. Much of the time, the dogs are in training to maintain the skills they have acquired. Today Hamilton Police deploy four police service dogs (PSD). Each dog is trained in human scent detection and tracking. PSDs are also used for drug detection, firearms and currency. Hamilton Police also deploy a PSD for explosives detection.

Hamilton has had one PSD killed in the line of duty - PSD Troy killed February 25, 1992 (shot by a suspect during an apprehension).

==== Crisis response ====
The Crisis Response Unit consists of three specialized units that respond to different niches of social disorder: the Crisis Support & Outreach Team; the Mobile Crisis Rapid Response Team; and the Social Navigation Program.

The Crisis Support & Outreach Team (COAST) is a partnership between the Hamilton Police Service, Halton Regional Police Service, and St. Joseph's Healthcare Hamilton, and serves residents in need of long-term mental health supports. The Team is responsible for connecting clients to care options, helping clients complete mental health assessments in partnership with police, and providing urgent, over-the-phone crisis support to the client and their caregivers and family members.

Like COAST, the Mobile Crisis Rapid Response Team is a partnership between the Hamilton Police Service, Halton Regional Police Service, and St. Joseph's Healthcare Hamilton, and is responsible for responding to urgent crisis calls made to 9-1-1 between the hours of 8 AM and 4 AM, seven days a week. The teams consist of a uniformed, specially-trained officer and a mental health professional responding together in a marked police cruiser. After the teams attend an incident, clients are connected to COAST for follow-up care.

The Social Navigation Program is a partnership between the Police Service and the Hamilton Paramedic Service, and is responsible for providing street support to marginalized and homeless Hamiltonians. The program connects clients with long-term care and services in partnership with a variety of social service providers in an effort to reduce the load on the judicial and hospital system. Unlike COAST, however, the program connects with clients at the point of police contact, as opposed to at the client's request.

==== Emergency response ====
During the 1972 Summer Olympics in Munich, West Germany, a terrorist attack was carried out against eleven Israeli Olympic team and delegation members who were killed along with a German police officer. The attack became known as the Munich Massacre. This attack prompted police agencies around the world to examine their capabilities in addressing such an attack of terrorism. As a result of international incidents of hostage takings like the one in Munich, plus other firearms related incidents in Canada and abroad, Chief Gordon Torrance had been planning to form a special unit to deal with high risk situations. The 1976 Summer Olympics were to be held in Montreal, Quebec. From June 23 to July 3, 1976, Hamilton was to be the host of the Pre-Olympics Basketball Tournament. Thirteen countries would be represented at that tournament, including Israel. The Munich Massacre was still fresh on the minds of those planning security for this event.

In September 1975, the chief issued a policy and procedure to deal with armed and barricaded persons. On Monday, November 3, 1975, Paul Lariviere of Champlain St., Hamilton, exchanged gunfire with Hamilton Police from his residence. An officer who had a revolver eventually killed him. Lariviere was found to have two rifles in his apartment. This incident was a catalyst for the Hamilton Police Service to form a specialized unit. On November 8, 1975, a decision was made by Chief Torrance to form a tactical unit that would begin training in January 1976. The unit was to be based on the concept of the New York City Police Department SWAT. The unit was known as "TEAM" which stood for ‘tactical emergency assault men’.

The mandate of the TEAM was to attain a peaceful ending to police calls involving hostage-taking, gun and other weapon-related incidents. Five TEAM officers were initially sent to the Anti-Sniper and Survival School at the FBI Academy in Quantico, Virginia. They also took on the responsibility of explosives disposal (EDU) and received this training through the Royal Canadian Mounted Police. The fifteen-man unit became operational on June 13, 1976. When the first female officer became a member of the unit, the name was changed to the emergency response unit (ERU). ERU members are trained to handle a variety of weapons, deal with dangerous, high-risk situations, and are utilized when entering a premises for the execution of search warrants.

==== Marine ====
A Hamilton Harbour Police shoulder flash worn by officers assigned to the shore patrol, a precursor of the Marine Unit.

The Marine Unit was established in 1921 as the Hamilton Harbour Police, an unarmed special constabulary maintained by the Hamilton Harbour Commission. The Harbour Police were responsible for marine safety across the Hamilton Harbour and for security policing on Commission-owned properties, a responsibility it maintained until 1986, when the constabulary was disbanded, with the security division privatized and the harbour policing division amalgamated into the Hamilton-Wentworth Regional Police.

In 1996, the Hamilton-Wentworth Regional Police entered into an agreement with the neighbouring Halton Regional Police Service to share a marine unit. This agreement was terminated in 2008, and the Halton Regional Police moved its marine unit to the Bronte Harbour.

Today, the Unit is responsible for patrolling the Hamilton Harbour, the entirety of the City's waterfront, and all inland waterways. The Unit actively patrols from mid-April until mid-November. In the off-season, it responds to calls for service on an as-requested basis.

In 2011, the Unit, with assistance from the Halton Regional Police, rescued a group of high-school rowers caught in a freak storm. Five Hamilton Police officers received the Rescue of the Year award from the Canadian Safe Boating Council for their work.

==== Mounted patrol ====
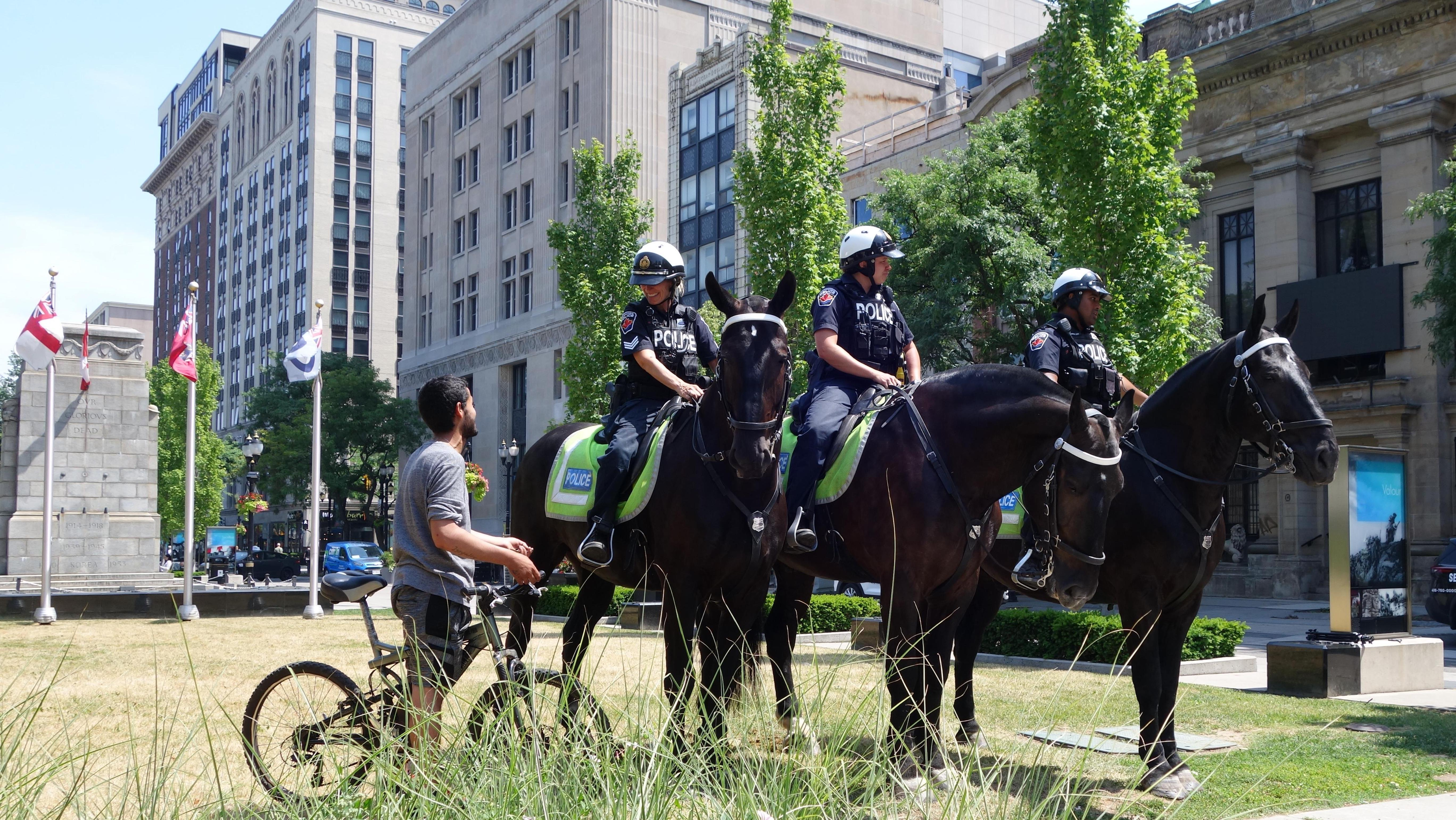
Members of the Hamilton Police Mounted Unit speak with a cyclist in a downtown park.

The mounted patrol unit (MPU) was formed in September 2009 and consists of five horses and six officers. The priorities of the MPU are to heighten the service’s ability to accomplish:

- crime prevention
- manage entertainment districts
- conduct search and rescue
- provide park and trail safety
- public safety during large scale festivals and events, protests and demonstrations

MPU offers coverage throughout the city of Hamilton with rotating day, afternoon and night shifts.

== Equipment ==
=== Fleet ===
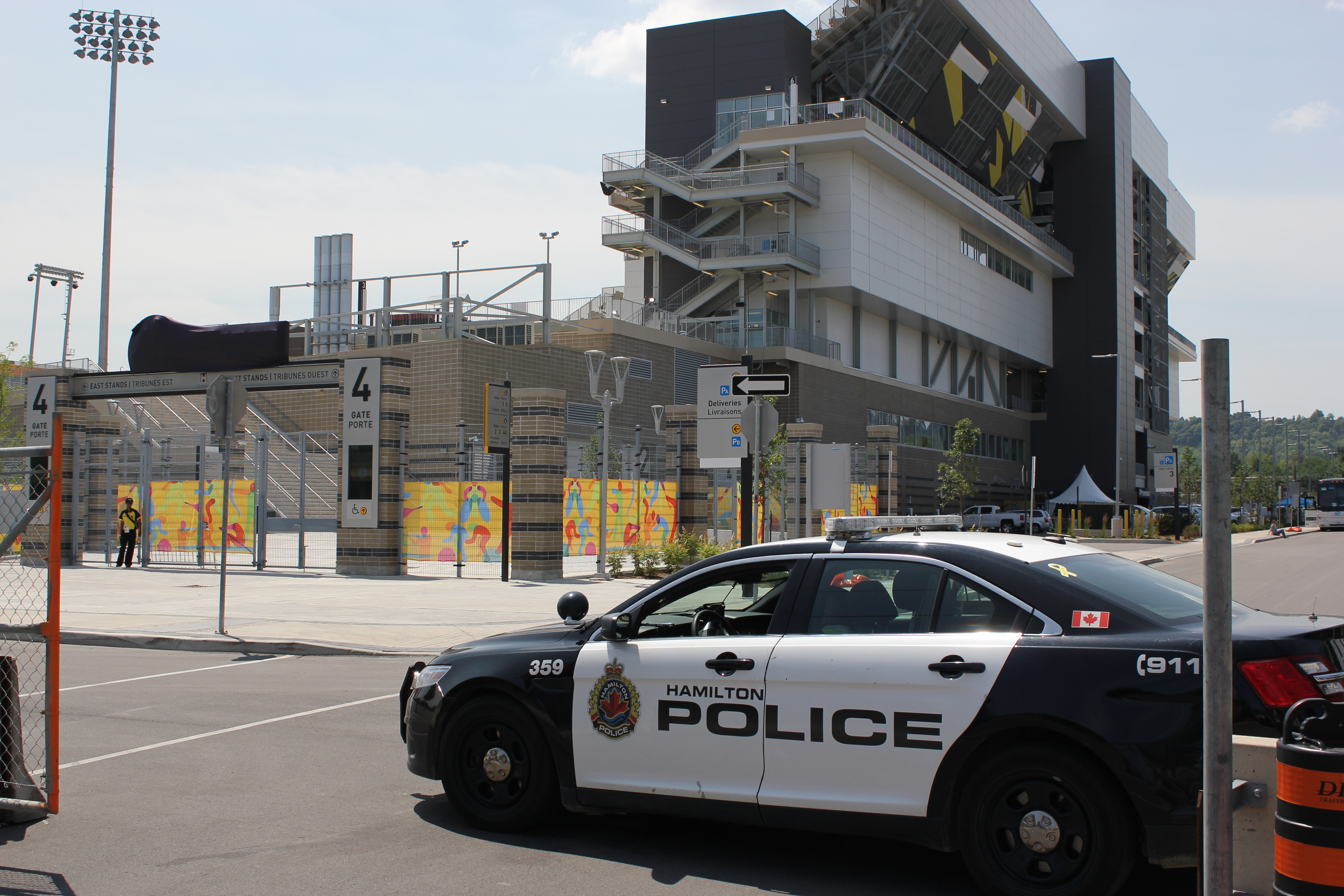
A Hamilton Police cruiser.

Police cars, also known as police cruisers are the most common vehicle used by the Hamilton Police Service. The vehicles are numbered in regards to their division and car number. For example, 710-1 represents that the vehicle is from division 1 (central), and the preceding 710 is the vehicle designation number. Vehicles assigned to uniformed patrol begin with a 7 for a car and a 6 for a sport utility vehicle. Specialty units such as ERU and canine begin with a 9.

==== Motor vehicles ====
Make/model	Type	Status	Origin
Ford Police Interceptor Utility (5th Gen)	(marked/unmarked) General patrol vehicle, traffic enforcement, supervisor	Active	United States
Ford Police Interceptor Utility (6th Gen)	(marked/unmarked)General patrol vehicle, traffic enforcement, supervisor	Active	United States
Dodge Charger Pursuit	(marked/unmarked) General patrol vehicle, traffic enforcement	Active	Canada
Chevrolet Blazer EV PPV	(marked) General patrol vehicle, electric vehicle fleet	Active / rolling out	Mexico

==== Support vehicles ====
Make/model	Type	Status	Origin
Dodge Mercedes-Benz Sprinter	Van—collision reconstruction, forensics		Germany
Ford ambulance	Former City of Hamilton EMS converted to forensics lab		United States
GMC Savanna	Van—emergency response unit		United States
Chevrolet Express van	Van-emergency response unit		United States
Ford Explorer	(un-marked) Canine unit		United States
Ford Expedition	(un-marked) Canine unit	retired	United States
Chevrolet Silverado	SUV—marine unit		United States
Ford F350	pickup truck with horses trailer — mounted mnit		United States
Terradyne Armored Vehicles Inc./Gurkha MPV — using F-550 chassis	Tactical armoured vehicle—emergency response unit		Canada
Ford F-series or GMC Vandura trucks	Prisoner transportation services court wagons		Canada
Ford van	van RIDE		United States

==== Marine unit vessels ====
Unit No.	Make/model	Type	Status	Origin
Marine II	Zodiac Pro 870	28' rigid-hulled inflatable boat patrol and rescue vessel.		United States
Marine III	Bombard Commando C4	14' rigid-hulled inflatable boat with 30 hp mercury outboard		France
Argo	ARGO (ATV manufacturer)	All-terrain amphibious vehicle		Canada
ROV	VideoRay UROVs Pro 3	Remotely operated underwater vehicle		United States

==== Aircraft ====
Make/model	Type	Status	Origin
Bell JetRanger	Helicopter	1999 pilot project shared with Halton Regional Police Service & Peel Regional Police.	Canada

==== Bicycles ====
Make/model	Type	Origin
Norco Bicycles	mountain bike RETIRED	Canada
Aquila Bicycle Company	mountain bike RETIRED	Canada
Specialized Bicycle Components	mountain bike RETIRED	United States
Cannondale Bicycle Corporation	mountain bike RETIRED	United States
Kona Bicycle Company	mountain bike RETIRED	Canada
Trek Bicycle Company	mountain bike RETIRED	Canada
Stevenson Bicycle Company	mountain bike RETIRED	Canada
Scott's Bicycle Company	mountain bike (2017 to present)	Canada
Trek Bicycle Company	mountain bike (2022 to present)	Canada

=== Weapons ===
In the 1990s, the majority of law enforcement agencies of Canada began wearing bulletproof vests and municipal police agencies started carrying semi-automatic handguns in the 9mm or .40 S&W calibre cartridge. The Hamilton Police carry Glock 22 handguns with hollow-point .40 S&W calibre ammunition.

These firearms replaced the aging .38 Special revolver. A police cruiser might carry a Remington Model 870 shotgun capable of firing a variety of shotgun shells. In 2018 patrol officers began carrying carbine rifles.

Other less-lethal weapons carried include conducted electroshock weapons, pepper spray, and expandable batons. In addition, the personal equipment of police officers typically includes: handcuffs, flashlights, portable radios, notebooks, and a pair of disposable gloves and Kevlar gloves.

The emergency response unit (ERU) members are issued Glock handguns with 9 mm calibre ammunition. They also use a variety of less-lethal weapons such as flexible baton rounds. Other weapons that have been used by ERU include:

- Tikka T3 .308
- Sako TRG .308 sniper rifle
- 37 mm flare gas gun
- Ruger Mini-14 RETIRED
- Steyr AUG assault rifle RETIRED
- MP5A3 9 mm submachine gun RETIRED
- Remington 870 shotgun
- Remington Model 770 rifle
- Diemaco C8 carbine
- Taser International M18 taser
- Taser International X26 taser
- Pepper spray (OC spray)
- Tear gas (CS gas)
- Rubber bullets or bean bags rounds
- ARWEN 37 37 mm riot gun (and AR-1 plastic baton rounds, may also be available to the public order unit (POU) for crowd/riot control)

== See also ==
- Hamilton Fire Department
- Hamilton Paramedic Service
- Hamilton Police Pipe Band
- Paul Manning
- Evelyn Dick
- Rocco Perri
- Musitano Crime Family
