= Federal Riot Gun =

Federal Laboratories
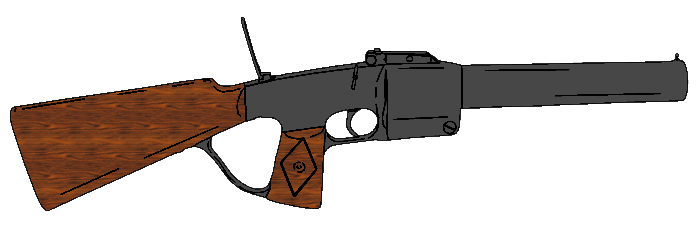
- Type: Riot gun
- Place of origin: United States

Service history
- In service: 1930-present

Production history
- Designer: Federal Laboratories Inc.
- Designed: 1930
- Manufacturer: Federal Laboratories Inc.
- Variants: Model NARG-38 (China)

The Federal Riot Gun (FRG) is a firearm made by Federal Laboratories Inc., designed to fire less-lethal munitions. Its ammunition includes 37 and 38mm baton and tear gas rounds. The baton rounds are cylindrical, plastic projectiles.

The most popular model, 37-mm M201-Z, has a distinctive ringed barrel.

== History ==
Introduced in the 1930s by Federal Laboratories Inc., of Pittsburgh, the FRG became the standard riot gun used by the British Army throughout The Troubles in Northern Ireland. A single-shot weapon, which breaks open by unlocking a catch at the top, it has since been replaced in British use by the multiple-shot ARWEN 37.

It was also issued by the Canadian Army, subsequently the Canadian Armed Forces.

It had been used by the South African Police Service during the apartheid era. Spare parts could not be purchased, due to the 1977 arms embargo, so a domestically produced weapon, the "Stopper" replaced the Federal Riot Gun.

== Less-lethal design ==
Fired at a relatively low velocity, the baton rounds are intended to knock rioters down, or momentarily stun them, but not to cause serious injury or death.

== Field experience ==
Safe operating procedures in the British Army eventually ruled out firing the gun directly at the human body, as it was found that the rounds could cause serious and permanent injuries.

In 1993, a constable of the Bermuda Police Service, acting the role of enemy for a rifle company of the Bermuda Regiment, being exercised at Camp Lejeune USMC Base, was seriously injured by a baton round fired from a soldier's FRG, shattering his jaw, which required extensive surgery to reconstruct.

Subsequently, orders were given that the weapons were to be fired into the ground ahead of rioters. The baton rounds would deflect upwards into the rioters, but would lose kinetic energy in the process.

== Gallery ==
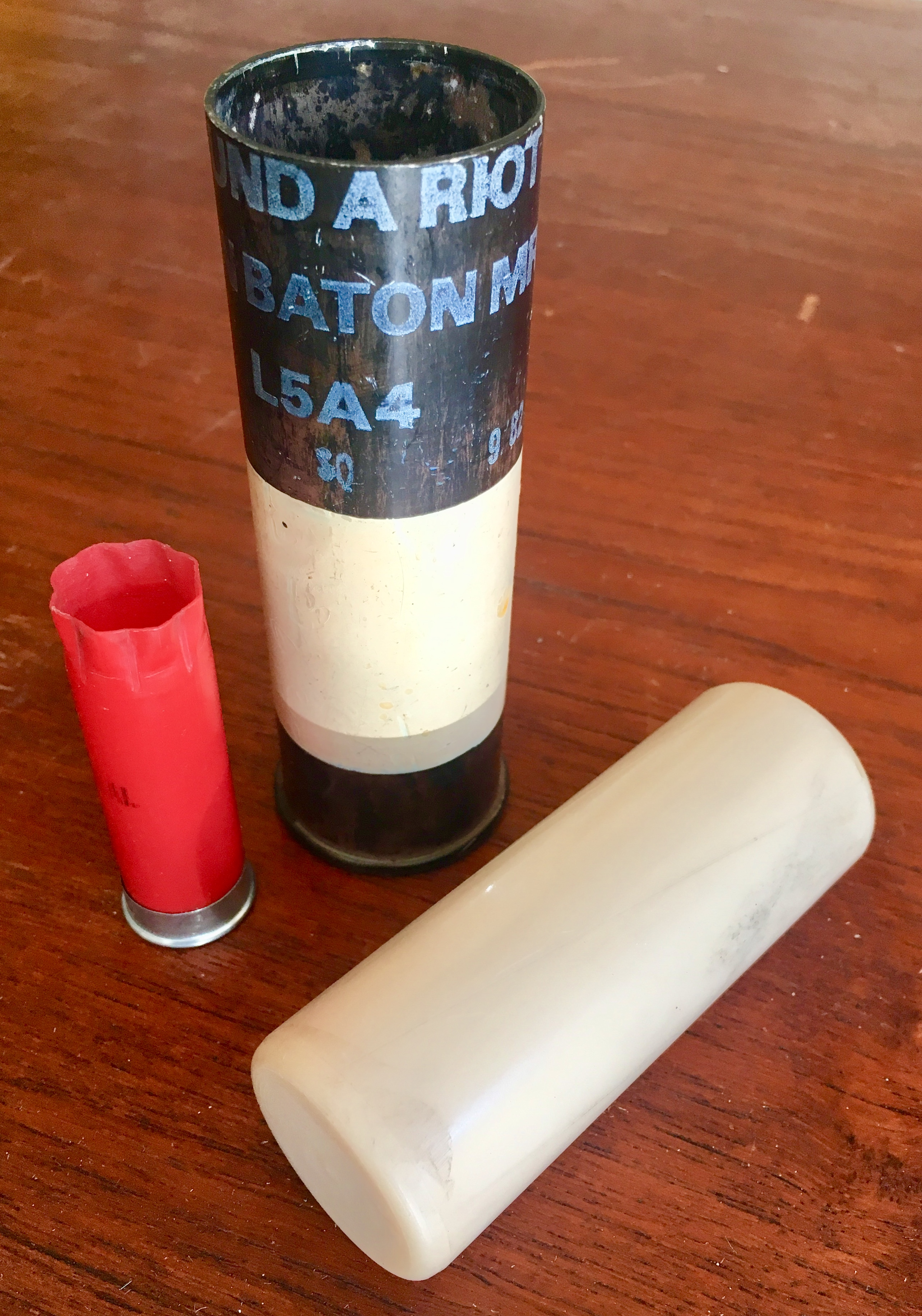
37mm L5A4 UK issue baton round ("rubber bullet")

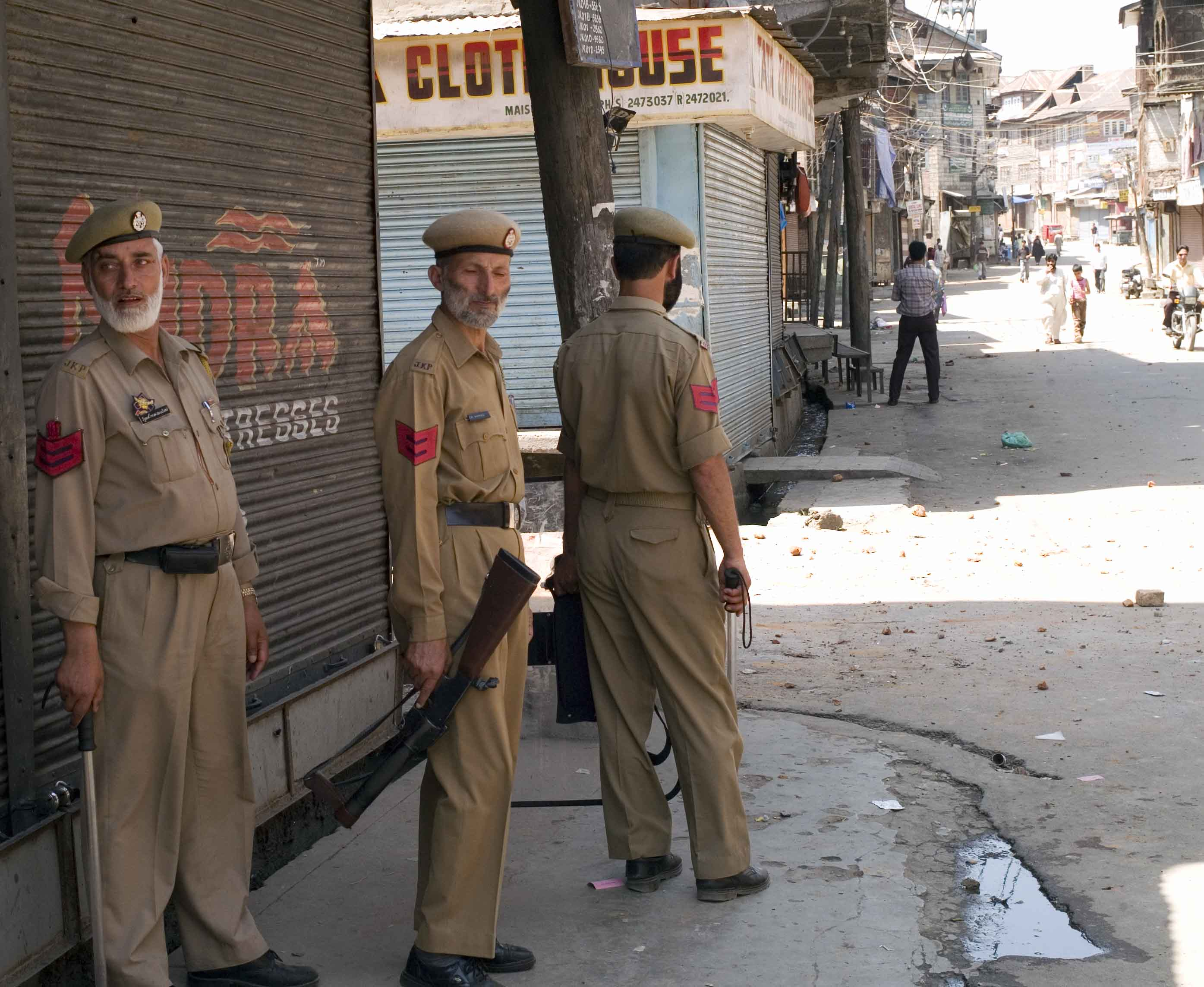
Used by Jammu and Kashmir Police officers in Srinagar

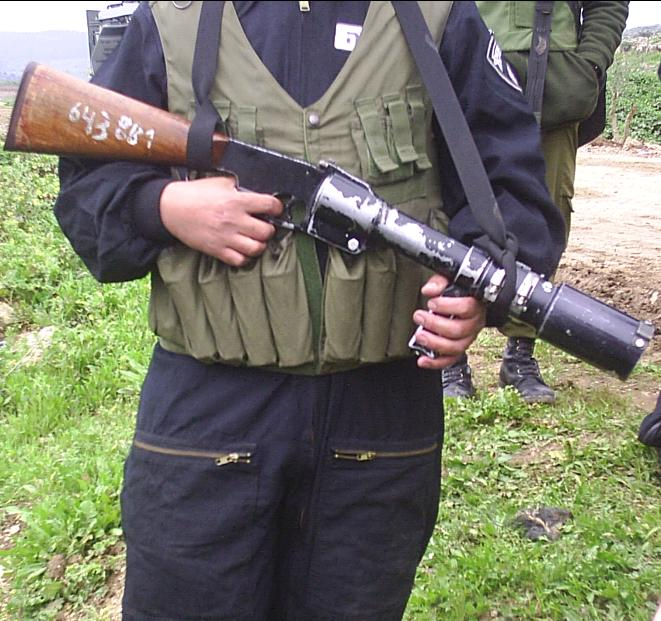
An Israeli Border Guard with a M201-Z

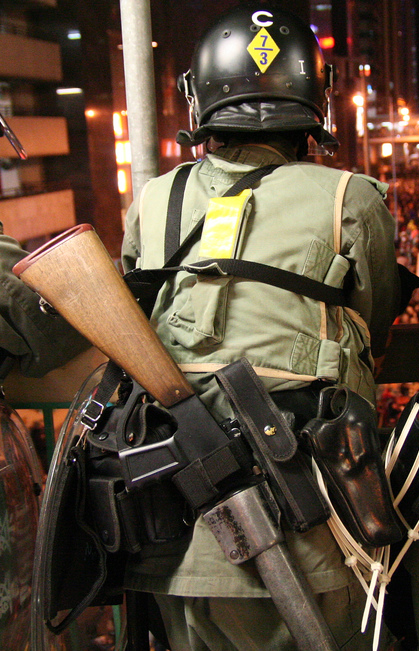
A Hong Kong PTU officer with a M201-Z

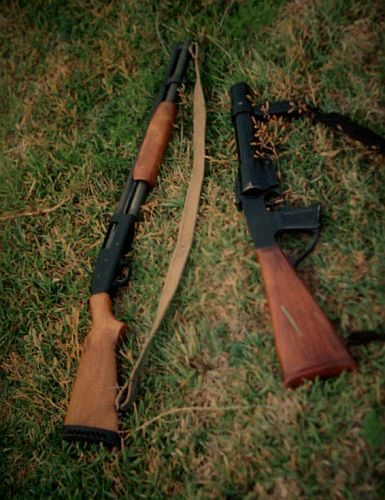
A Federal M201-Z Riot Gun (right), with a Mossberg 500 shotgun, of the Bermuda Regiment.
