= Hamilton Police Pipe Band =

Canadian pipe band

- Established: 1961
- Location: Hamilton, Ontario, Canada
- Grade: 4
- Website: www.hppb.ca/about.html

The Hamilton Police Pipe Band is a competitive pipe band based in Hamilton, Ontario, Canada. The band currently consists of a competing Grade 4 band, a developing Grade 5 band, and a teaching program. Under the leadership of Drum Sergeant Sandy McKail and Pipe Major Trish Kirkwood, the Hamilton Police Pipe Band (HPPB) has experienced numerous successful seasons. Over the past 15 years, the band has earned several local and North American titles, including North American, Canadian, Transatlantic, and Nova Scotia championships, as well as multiple first-place finishes at PPBSO Highland Games across Ontario.

Pipe Major Trish Kirkwood, who has led the band for more than 15 years, guided a Grade 5 band to compete successfully at the Grade 2 level. After the 2017 World Pipe Band Championships, Kirkwood stepped down to the position of pipe sergeant, passing leadership to John Elliot while remaining part of the management team. Under Elliot’s direction, the band competed in Grade 2 until its dissolution in 2018. Following this, Kirkwood resumed her role as pipe major, leading the band in Grade 4 competitions.

Drum Sergeant Sandy McKail played a central role in the restructuring of HPPB after the folding of its previous Grade 2 band nearly 15 years ago. As leading drummer and drumming instructor across all levels, McKail developed successful drum scores for both the snare and midsection. His ensemble approach helped unify the band’s musical expression, and his drum arrangements achieved consistent success in the junior grades for almost a decade.

The midsection was led by Drum Sergeant Sandy McKail and Lead Tenor Stacey McKail. In recent years, the lead snare role was filled by Cameron McKail (2018) and James Kirkwood (2019), both long-time students of Sandy McKail. After a successful 2019 season, Sandy McKail stepped down from management, and both Sandy and Stacey McKail joined the Peel Regional Police Pipe Band Grade 2 as players. Former students James Kirkwood (2020) and Cameron McKail (2019) also departed, later joining the Grade 1 78th Fraser Highlanders as snare drummers.

Colin McKail (2020) also left the band and now serves as the bass drummer for the 78th Fraser Highlanders Grade 1 band. The current drum sergeant is Graham Kirkwood, formerly of the Peel Regional Police Pipe Band, while Ryan Robertson, previously lead tenor of the 78th Fraser Highlanders (Ontario), serves as bass drummer and lead tenor for the bass section.

== History ==
The Hamilton Police Pipe Band was established in 1961. In the past, the band has competed as high as the Grade 2 level, but not since 2009, when it participated in the Kincardine Scottish Festival. In 2010, the resignation of its pipe major and lead drummer created a significant setback.

Following this, under Pipe Major Trish Kirkwood and drumming instructor Sandy McKail, the band progressed to the Grade 3 level in 2013. After a strong performance in the 2017 season, the band was promoted to Grade 2, while its Grade 5 band, having won the Champion Supreme title, advanced to Grade 4.

The band's most notable competitive successes occurred between 2003 and 2009, under Pipe Major Peter Aumonier and Leading Drummer John Gaudet. During this period, the band achieved the following:

- 2004 – Grade 4 North American Championships winner
- 2005 – First place at North Berwick, Scotland
- 2005 – Winner of the Drumming category at the World Pipe Band Championships
- 2006 – Undefeated in the Ontario circuit and winner of the North American Pipe Band Championships, Grade 3
- 2008 – Winner of the North American Pipe Band Championships, Grade 2
- 2009 – North American Pipe Band Championships, Grade 2

This six-year progression from Grade 5 in 2003 to Grade 2 in 2008 was a significant achievement. After the band folded, it was noted that fifteen members of the 2009 band competed in the finals at the 2012 World Pipe Band Championships, reflecting the lasting influence of Aumonier and Gaudet's leadership.

In the 2018 season, John Elliot became the senior pipe major and led the Grade 2 band to a respectable finish. Following his departure during the off-season, the Grade 2 band was disbanded, and efforts were redirected toward the Grade 4 band. Trish Kirkwood then assumed leadership of the Grade 4 band, with her son, James Kirkwood, as lead drummer.

The band previously offered a youth bagpipe instruction program, which has since become dormant due to a lack of facilities.

The Hamilton Police Pipe Band performs at various ceremonies and parades. The band also participated in the state funeral of former Governor General Lincoln Alexander.

== Achievements ==
- 2019 PPBSO Champion Supreme Pipe Band Grade 4
- 2017 PPBSO Champion Supreme Pipe Band Grade 5
- 2016 North American Champions, Grade 5 Drums
- 2014 PPBSO Champion Supreme Pipe Band Grade 5
- 2014 North American Pipe Band Champions Grade 5
- 2013 PPBSO Champion Supreme Pipe Band Grade 4
- 2013 Nova Scotia Champions Grade 4
- 2013 Trans Atlantic Canada champions grade 4
- 2011 North American pipe band champions grade 5
- 2009 Pipers and Pipe Band Society of Ontario Champion Supreme, Grade 2 & 4
- 2009 North American Pipe Band Champions, Grade 4,
- 2008 North American Pipe Band Champions, Grade 2
- 2007-8 North American Champions, Grade 5 drums
- 2007 Canadian Pipe Band Champions, Grade 2
- 2006 North American Pipe Band Champions, Grade 3
- 2005 World Champions, Grade 3B drum corps
- 2005-2006 Canadian Pipe Band Champions, Grade 3
- 2004 North American Pipe Band Champions, Grade 4
- 2004 Canadian Pipe Band Champions, Grade 4 & 5
- 2003 Canadian Pipe Band Champions, Grade 4
