= Hamilton Fire Department =

Operational area
- Country: Canada
- Province: Ontario
- City: Hamilton

Agency overview
- Established: 2001 (amalgamation)
- Fire chief: David Cunliffe
- Motto: Protect and promote quality of life and public safety

Facilities and equipment
- Divisions: 1
- Battalions: 3
- Stations: 26
- Engines: 23
- Trucks: 10
- Platforms: 1
- Squads: 3
- Rescues: 5
- Tenders: 11
- HAZMAT: 1
- Wildland: 1

Website
- Official website

The Hamilton Fire Department provides fire protection, technical rescue services, hazardous materials response, and first responder emergency medical assistance to the city of Hamilton, Ontario.

== History ==
The fire department in Hamilton dates back to 1879, when Alexander Aitchison was appointed Fire Chief of the city. Aitchison was responsible for radically reforming the department, and during his tenure, the department was changed into an entirely paid one, as well as introducing the first swinging harness and sliding pole in Canada.

Starting in 1990, Hamilton area firefighters have been instructed on how to operate heart defibrillators, as it often takes less time for firefighters to reach victims compared to ambulance paramedics. A study found that the policy change decreased the amount of time between a 911 call and when the patient received defibrillation by almost 30 percent.

In 1997, the department faced one of its worst crises: the Plastimet fire. The fire was located at a plastics-recycling facility, and began a warehouse containing bales of polyvinyl chloride plastics. Firefighters battled the conflagration for four days, and the plume of toxins and smoke released by the burning plastics may have caused the deaths of several Hamilton firefighters in the years after the fire. The Plastimet fire remains the largest plastics fire in Canadian history, and one of Canada's worst environmental disasters.

In 2001, Hamilton amalgamated with the other municipalities of Hamilton-Wentworth Region to create an expanded City of Hamilton. As a result, the Hamilton Fire Department, which served the original city, was merged with the fire departments of Ancaster, Dundas, Flamborough, Glanbrook and Stoney Creek. The department went from 12 stations to 26, and became a composite department with both full-time and paid-on-call firefighters.

In 2010, the department changed to a 24-shift schedule. Previously, firefighters had worked 10-hour day shifts and 14-hour night shifts.

In 2011, the department hired Rob Simonds as its new chief, replacing the retiring Jim Kay.

In 2012, a firefighter was terminated after using racial slurs during an argument with a coworker. In 2015, an arbitrator determined that the firefighter had been terminated without just cause. The firefighter was reinstated, and received a 10-day suspension in accordance with the arbitrator's findings. The other firefighter involved in the altercation received a 5-day suspension for his role in the incident. The incident led to calls for greater diversity in the department.

In 2016, David Cunliffe was appointed Fire Chief, succeeding Robert Simonds.

In 2019, a Hamilton firefighter suffered serious injuries after falling off the edge of the Niagara Escarpment while trying to rescue a group of lost hikers.

== Fire stations and apparatus ==
Station	Address	Build year(s)	Apparatus
1 (Central Station)	35 John St. N	1913/1976/2006	Engine 1, Ladder 1, Pumper 1, Platoon Chief 1, Supply 1, Air 1
2	1400 Upper Wellington St.	1991	Engine 2, District Chief 3
3	965 Garth St.	1978/2000	Engine 3
4	729 Upper Sherman Ave.	1994	Ladder 4, Engine 4, Support 4, HazMat 2
5 & 22 (Training)	1227 Stone Church Rd. E	2011	Ladder 5, Car 73, Command Unit, Car 1, Car 2, Car 3, Car 10, Pump 47, Pump 90, Ladder 90, Training 1, Training 2, Training 3, Training 4, Training 5, Supply 2, RIT trailer, Support 41
6	246 Wentworth St. N	1982	Pump 6, Car 74, Air 6, Parade 1926 Bickle-Ahrens-Fox, Box 43, Box 43A
7	225 Quigley Rd.	1985	Engine 7
8	400 Melvin Ave.	1957/2000	Engine 8, District Chief 2
9	125 Kenilworth Ave. N	2002	Pump 9, Ladder 9
10	1455 Main St. W	1953/2000	Ladder 10
11	24 Ray St. S	1959/2013	Engine 11
12	199 Hamilton Regional Rd. 8	1989	Engine 12, Ladder 12, Support 12 (Cross-staffed by L12)
13 (Mechanical Division)	177 Bay St. N		Maintenance 1, Maintenance 2, Mobile Fire Pump Testing and Training Unit
14	595 Chapel Hill Rd.		Tanker 14, Fire Safety House
15	415 Arvin Ave.	1995	Pump 15
16	939 Barton St.	1995	Pump 16, Tanker 16, Squad 16
17	363 Isaac Brock Dr.	1985	Engine 17, Tanker 17, Pump 17
18	2636 Hamilton Regional Rd. 56	2001	Pump 18, Ladder 18, Tanker 18, Rescue 18
19	3302 Homestead Dr.	1991	Pump 19, Tanker 19, Rescue 19
20	661 Garner Rd. E., Ancaster	2009	Ladder 20
21	365 Wilson St. W., Ancaster	1990	Engine 21, Pump 21, Tanker 21, Support 21, Trail 1
23	19 Memorial Square, Dundas	1972	Engine 23, Support 23, Parade
24	256 Parkside Dr., Waterdown	1992	Engine 24, Ladder 24, Tanker 24, Support 24
25	361 Old Brock Rd., Greensville	1967/2000	Pump 25, Tanker 25, Rescue 25, Brush 25
26	119 Lynden Rd., Lynden	1976/1995	Pump 26, Tanker 26, Support 26
27	795 Old Highway 8, Rockton	1967/1993	Pump 27, Tanker 27, Squad 27
28	1801 Brock Rd., Freelton	1962/1994	Pump 28, Tanker 28, Rescue 28
29 (Fire Prevention)	55 King William St.		Fire Prevention 1, Fire Prevention 2
30 (Stores)	489 Victoria Ave. N		

Volunteer Station
Full time & Volunteer Station

== Response Guidelines and Special Units ==
=== Urban Responses ===
Call Type	Alarm Level	Initial Assignment
Report of Structure Fire	Fire	3 Engines, 1 Ladder, 1 Rescue, 1 District Chief, 2 Safety Officers (Car 73, Car 74) or 2 Engines, 2 Ladders, 1 Rescue, 1 District Chief, 2 Safety Officers (Car 73, Car 74)
Multiple Alarm (Upgrade)	Fire	1 Engine, 1 Ladder, 1 District Chief, Box 43 Rehab Unit
Fire Alarm	Fire	2 Units (Engine, Ladder or Rescue)
Smoke Appliance Fire Unknown Fire Fire Out Chimney Fire	Fire	1 Engine and 1 Ladder
Vehicle Fire Rubbish Fire Grass Fire Smoke Detector Residential Alarm Burn Complaint	Fire	1 Engine or 1 Ladder
Medical EMS/Police Assist Carbon Monoxide Odours - Fire Related Gas Spill - Minor Propane Leak - Minor Hydro Problem Electrical Problem Furnace Problem Flooding	Assistance	1 Engine or 1 Ladder or 1 Rescue
Vehicle Accident	Rescue	1 Engine or 1 Ladder, 1 Rescue
Vehicle Accident - Entrapment Vehicle Accident - Highway	Rescue	2 Engines, 1 Rescue or 1 Engine, 1 Ladder, 1 Rescue
Stuck Elevator	Rescue	1 Engine, 1 Ladder, 1 Rescue
Rail Trail	Rescue	1 Engine or 1 Rescue, 1 District Chief
Pool Rescue Water Rescue	Rescue	1 Engine, 1 Rescue, 1 District Chief or 2 Engines, 1 District Chief
Industrial Accident	Rescue	2 Engines, 1 Rescue
Rope Rescue	Rescue	Closest Engine or Ladder, 3 Technical Rescue Engines, 1 Rescue, Confined Space Support 23, 1 District Chief, 2 Safety Officers (Car 73, Car 74)
Confined Space	Rescue	Closest Engine or Ladder, 3 Technical Rescue Engines, 1 HAZMAT Unit, 1 Rescue, Confined Space Support 23, 1 District Chief, 2 Safety Officers (Car 73, Car 74)
HAZMAT Odours Propane Leak - Major	HAZMAT	1 Engine or 1 Ladder or 1 Rescue, 1 HAZMAT Unit
Natural Gas	HAZMAT	2 Engines, 1 Ladder, 1 Rescue, 1 District Chief, 2 Safety Officers (Car 73, Car 74)
HAZMAT - L1	HAZMAT	Closest Engine or Ladder, 1 HAZMAT Unit
HAZMAT - L2	HAZMAT	Closest Engine or Ladder, HAZMAT 2, Rescue 4, HAZMAT Support 4, 1 District Chief, 2 Safety Officers (Car 73, Car 74)
HAZMAT - L3	HAZMAT	2 Closest Engines or Ladders, 2 HAZMAT Engines, HAZMAT 2, Rescue 4, HAZMAT Support 4, 1 District Chief, 2 Safety Officers (Car 73, Car 74)

=== Rural Responses ===
Call Type	Alarm Level	Initial Assignment
Report of Structure Fire	Fire	2 Urban Engines or Ladders, 2 Pumpers, 1 Ladder or Tower, 1 Rescue, Squad or Support Unit, 4 Tankers, 1 District Chief, 2 Safety Officers (Car 73, Car 74)
Fire Alarm Smoke Appliance Fire Unknown Fire Fire Out Chimney Fire	Fire	1 Pumper, 1 Tanker, 1 Rescue, Squad, Support Unit or Ladder
Vehicle Fire Rubbish Fire Grass Fire Smoke Detector Residential Alarm Burn Complaint	Fire	1 Pumper and 1 Tanker
Medical EMS/Police Assist Carbon Monoxide Odours - Fire Related Gas Spill - Minor Propane Leak - Minor Hydro Problem Electrical Problem Furnace Problem Flooding	Assistance	1 Pumper or 1 Rescue or 1 Squad or 1 Support Unit
Vehicle Accident	Rescue	1 Pumper, 1 Tanker, 1 Rescue or 1 Squad or 1 Ladder
Vehicle Accident - Highway	Rescue	2 Urban Engines, 1 Rescue, 1 Tanker (Ancaster - 403) or 1 Urban Engine, 1 Ladder, 1 Rescue, 1 Squad, 1 Tanker (Stoney Creek - QEW)
Pool Rescue Water Rescue	Rescue	1 Urban Engine, 1 Pumper, 1 Rescue, Squad or Support Unit, 1 District Chief, Marine Rescue Support 12
Industrial Accident	Rescue	1 Urban Engine, 1 Urban Rescue, 1 Pumper, 1 Tanker, 1 Rescue, Squad, Support Unit or Tower
Rope Rescue	Rescue	1 Pumper, 1 Tanker, 1 Rescue, 3 Technical Rescue Engines, Confined Space Support 23, 1 District Chief, Safety Chief (Car 73)
Confined Space	Rescue	1 Pumper, 1 Tanker, 1 Rescue, 3 Technical Rescue Engines, 1 HAZMAT Unit, Confined Space Support 23, 1 District Chief, Safety Chief (Car 73)
HAZMAT Odours Propane Leak - Major	HAZMAT	1 Pumper, 1 Tanker, 1 HAZMAT Unit
Natural Gas	HAZMAT	1 Urban Engine, 1 Urban Rescue, 2 Pumpers, 1 Ladder, 1 Rescue, Squad, Support Unit or Tower, 4 Tankers, 1 District Chief, Safety Chief (Car 73)
Aircraft Emergency (John C Munro Airport)	Rescue/HAZMAT	1 Pumper, 1 Rescue, Squad, Support Unit or Tower, 3 Tankers, 2 HAZMAT Engines, HAZMAT 2, Rescue 4, HAZMAT Support 4, 1 District Chief, 2 Safety Officers (Car 73, Car 74)

=== Special Units ===
Team	Duties	Units
Technical Rescue	Rope Rescue Confined Space Rescue	Engine 3, Engine 12, Engine 17, Engine 23 Support 23
HAZMAT	Hazardous Materials and CBRNE Incidents	Engine 8, Engine 11 Rescue 4 HAZMAT 2, HAZMAT Support 4 (Both Cross-Staffed by Ladder 4)
Marine Rescue	Water Rescue Pool Rescue Vehicle into Water	1 Engine, 1 Pumper, 1 District Chief, Support 12 (Cross-Staffed by Ladder 12)

== See also ==
- Hamilton Paramedic Service
- Hamilton Police Service
- City of Hamilton, Ontario
- Hamilton City Council
- Toronto Fire Services
- Mississauga Fire and Emergency Services
- Peel Regional Paramedic Services
- Ancaster, Ontario
- Dundas, Ontario
- Stoney Creek, Ontario
- Burlington, Ontario
- Volunteer Firefighter
