= Federal Laboratories (disambiguation) =

Federal Laboratories (often FedLabs or Federal Labs) was a US firearms manufacturer.

Federal Laboratories may also refer to:

- Swiss Federal Laboratories for Materials Science and Technology
- Federal Laboratory Consortium for Technology Transfer, an American network of federal laboratories

== See also ==
- FBI Laboratory
- List of federal agencies in the United States
- List of research parks
- Research and development
