= MZW (disambiguation) =

MZW is an album by Swedish singer and model Måns Zelmerlöw

MZW or mzw may also refer to

- Deg language, a Gurunsi language spoken in Ghana and the Ivory Coast. (ISO 639-3: mzw)
- Manjhwe railway station, Bihar, India (station code: MZW)
- Mécheria Airport, a military airport near Mécheria, Algeria (IATA: MZW)

== See also ==
- TW73, a teargas grenade gun developed in Switzerland, now called the Mehrzweckwerfer (General Purpose Thrower) MZW 73/91
