= Mace Security International =

American security company

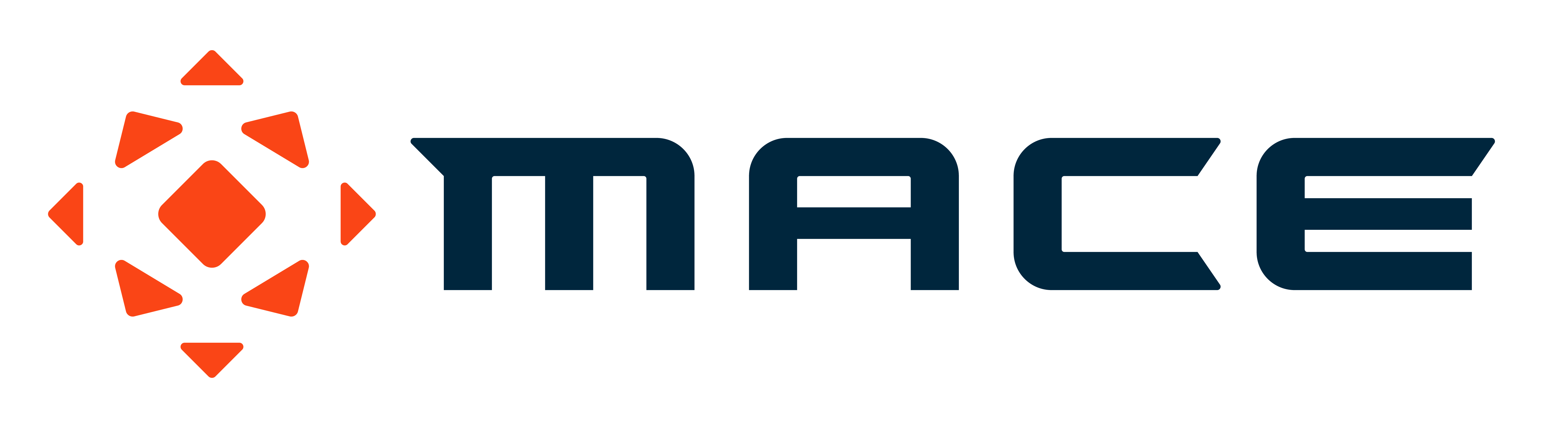
- Type: Corporation
- Industry: Personal Safety and Security
- Founded: 1 January 1970
- Headquarters: Cleveland, Ohio, US
- Products: Personal Defense Products, Home Security Products
- Number of employees: 50 (2013)
- Website: www.mace.com

Mace Security International, Inc. a US-based company that specializes in producing personal safety and security products. Their product line includes popular items such as Mace pepper spray, stun guns, personal alarms, and law enforcement and private security equipment.

== History ==
- 1965: Chemical Mace was invented in 1965 by Allan Lee Litman, founder and co-owner of Pittsburgh-based General Ordinance Equipment Corporation, after his wife, Doris, was threatened on the street.
- 1987: The company was sold to Smith & Wesson and then transferred to new owner, Jon E. Goodrich, in April 1987, along with the rest of Smith & Wesson's chemical division. In 1987 Mace filed for assignment of the ownership of the MACE brand trademark.
- 1993: The company changed the name of Mark Sport, Inc to Mace Security International. That same year in September, Mace had its initial public offering on the Nasdaq National Market System, trading under the symbol MACE.
- 1994: Purchased Federal Laboratories, the largest tear gas manufacturer in the world.
- 1998: Sold Federal Laboratories to Armor Holdings, Inc.
- 1999: The company merged with American Wash Services, a company that was engaged in operating car wash facilities, into a wholly owned subsidiary of Mace Security International. Mace purchased over 50 car and truck washes in 1999 and 2000.
- 2002: Surveillance products were added to its security division. The company acquired some assets and operations of Micro-Tech, a manufacturer and retailer of electronic security and surveillance devices, as a base business to expand in the security surveillance equipment business.
- 2003: Acquired the assets of Vernex, a producer of cathode ray tubes, liquid crystal displays and plasma monitors and televisions.
- 2004: Acquired Security and More and Industrial Vision Source from American Building Control
- 2004: Develops and introduces pepper gel product.
- 2005: The company exits the car and truck wash business, selling the majority of these operations from 2005 through 2010.
- 2007: Purchases growing online and digital media services company, Linkstar Interactive.
- 2007: Signs exclusive agreement to market less-than-lethal aerosol gun for its patented pepper gel and pepper spray formulations.
- 2008: Announces termination of Louis D. Paolino as CEO and chairman; appoints Gerald Laflamme as interim CEO and Jack Mallon as chairman
- 2008: Appoints Veteran Security Industry Executive, Dennis R. Raefield, as its new president and chief executive officer.
- 2009: Acquires Central Station Security Systems, Inc., a wholesale security monitoring company
- 2009: partners with Xanboo, Inc.
- 2009: Central Station Security Systems, Inc. becomes Mace Central Station, Inc. and becomes one of the first US central stations to earn the ETL listing.
- 2020: Now 100% focused on the personal safety and security space.
- 2024: Acquired by private company.

== Company overview ==
=== Locations ===
Mace operates from its corporate headquarters in Cleveland, Ohio, US.
