= Mace (spray) =

Brand name of an aerosol self-defense spray

- Type: Self-defense chemical spray
- Inventor: Alan Lee Litman
- Inception: 1960s
- Manufacturer: Mace Security International
- Available: Discontinued
- Website: mace.com

Mace is the brand name of an early type of aerosol self-defense spray invented by Alan Lee Litman in the 1960s. The first commercial product of its type, Litman's design packaged phenacyl chloride (CN) tear gas dissolved in hydrocarbon solvents into a small aerosol spray can, usable in many environments and strong enough to act as a deterrent and incapacitant when sprayed in the face.

A generic trademark, its popularity led to the name "mace" being commonly used for other defense sprays regardless of their composition, and for the term "maced" to be used to reference being pepper sprayed. It is unrelated to the spice mace.

== History ==
The original formulation consisted of 1% chloroacetophenone (CN) in a solvent of 2-butanol, propylene glycol, cyclohexene, and dipropylene glycol methyl ether. Chemical Mace was originally developed in the 1960s by Allan Lee Litman and his wife, Doris Litman, after one of Doris's female colleagues was robbed in Pittsburgh. In 1987, Chemical Mace was sold to Smith & Wesson and manufactured by their Lake Erie Chemical division. Smith & Wesson subsequently transferred ownership to Jon E. Goodrich along with the rest of the chemical division in what is now Mace Security International, which also owns federal trademark registrations for the term "mace".

Historically, "chemical mace" was the development of irritant with the active ingredient called phenacyl chloride (CN) to incapacitate others whereas the term "Mace" is a trademarked term for use on personal defense sprays. Though the design has been expanded on, the original chemical mace formula using only CN has since been discontinued. Due to the potentially toxic nature of CN and the generally superior incapacitating qualities of oleoresin capsicum (OC) pepper spray in most situations, the early CN has been mostly supplanted by OC formulas in police use, although Mace Security International still produces "Triple Action" formula combining CN, OC and an ultraviolet marker dye.
