= Riot gun =

Type of firearm

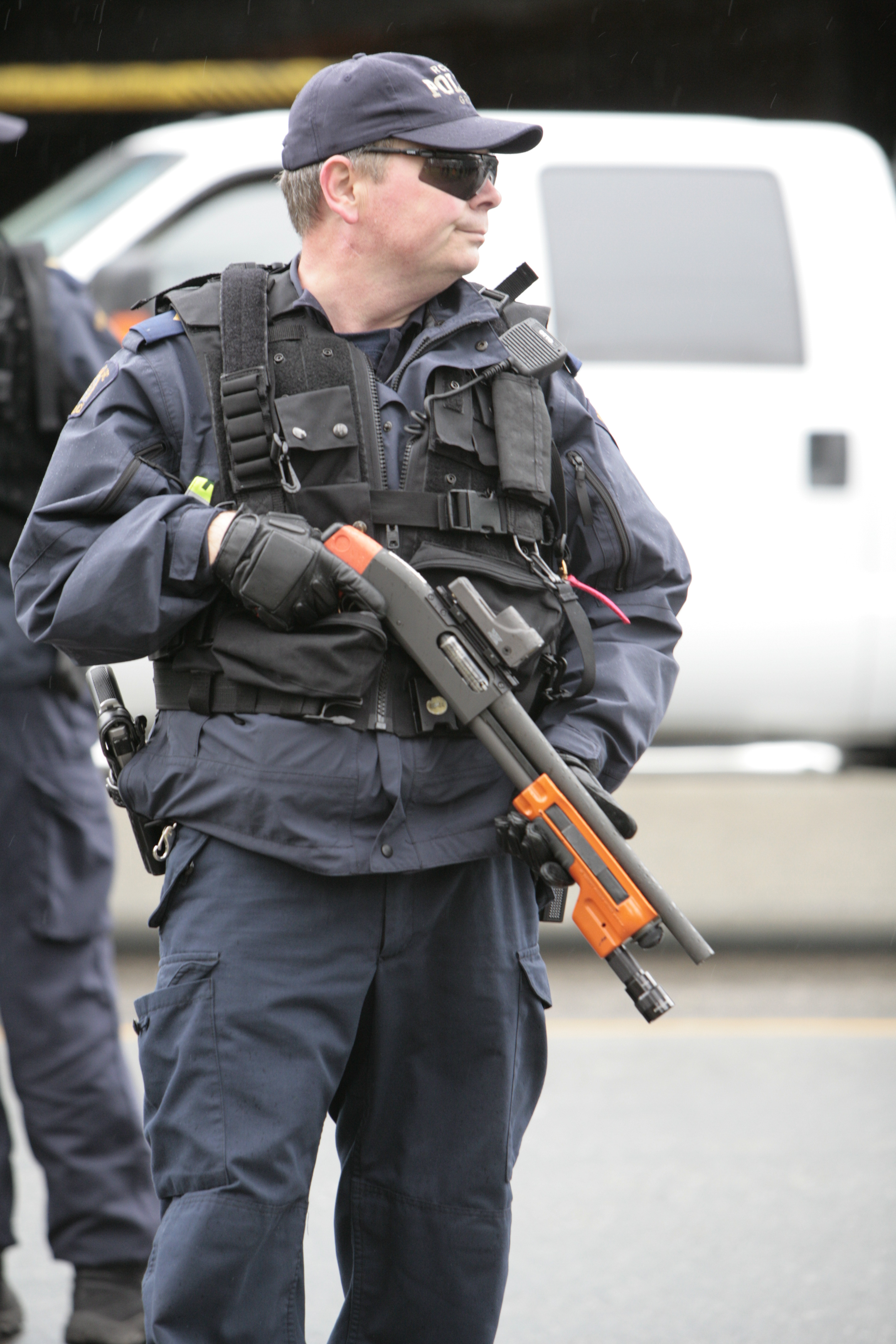
A Royal Canadian Mounted Police officer with a bean bag shotgun

In current usage, a riot gun or less-lethal launcher is a type of firearm used to fire "non-lethal" or "less-lethal" ammunition for the purpose of suppressing riots or apprehending suspects with minimal harm or risk. Less-lethal launchers may be special purpose firearms designed for riot control use, or standard firearms, usually shotguns and grenade launchers, adapted for riot control use with appropriate ammunition. The ammunition is most commonly found in 12 gauge (18.5 mm/.729 inch) shotguns and 37mm (1.46 inch) or 40 mm (1.57 inch) grenade launchers.

In the United States, the term riot gun more commonly refers to a riot shotgun.

== Ammunition ==
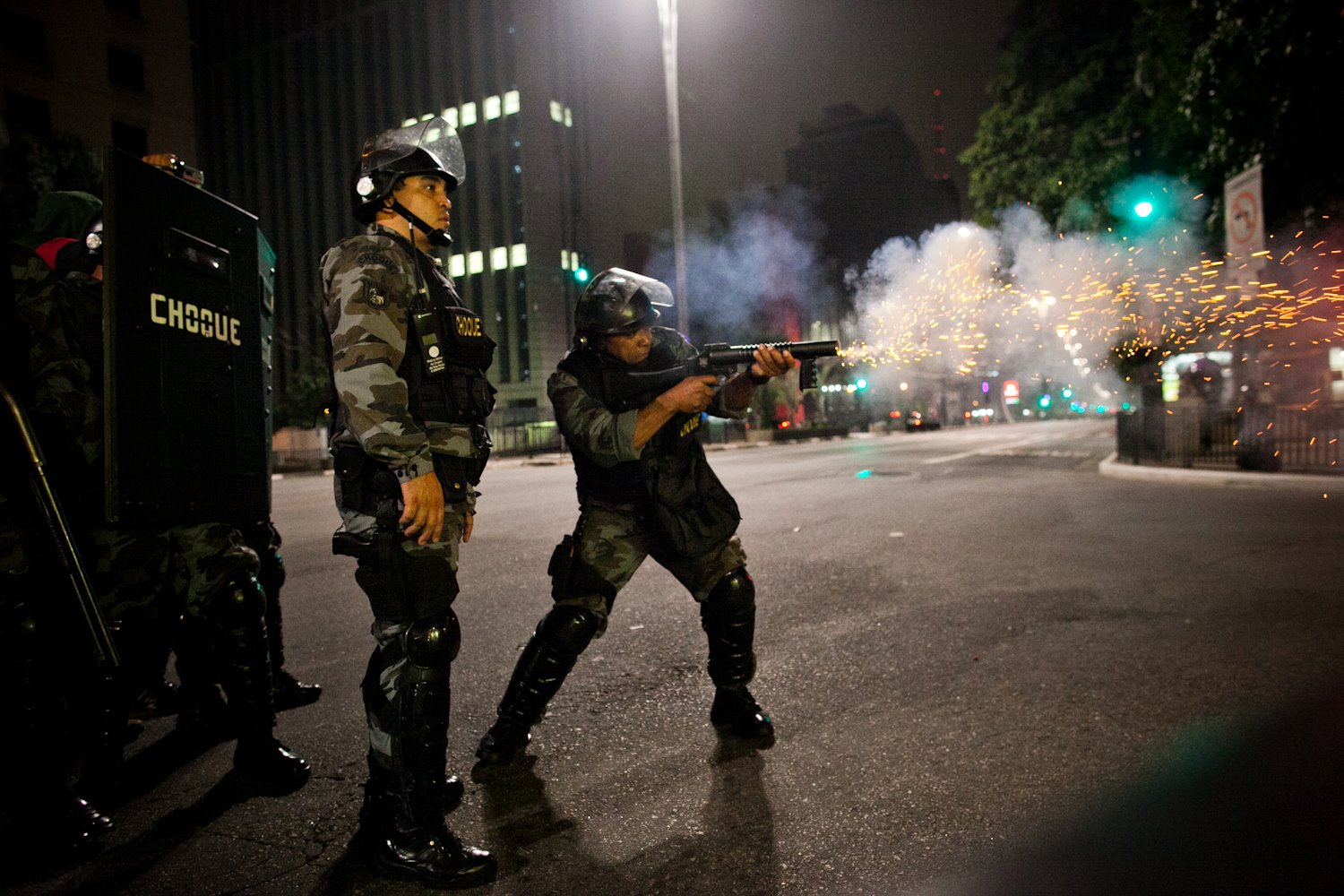
A Military Police of São Paulo State officer firing a grenade launcher loaded with tear gas

Less-lethal launchers can fire various sorts of ammunition, including:

- Impact projectiles, which rely on kinetic energy, such as baton rounds, bean bag rounds, or rubber bullets
- Tear gas cartridge
- Pepper spray
- Stun rounds
- Smoke round
- Less-lethal shotgun shells
- Less-lethal grenades
- Sound-emitting projectiles
- GLIMPS (Grenade-Launched Imaging Modular Projectile System), a round containing a small camera that transmits images

To avoid breaking the projectile up, less-lethal cartridges are often propelled by gunpowder, which, when fired, may make an eruption of sparks and smoke larger than those made by modern cartridges propelled by smokeless powder.

=== Chemical agent ammunition ===
Chemical agents may be dispersed in three ways: muzzle dispersion, canister, and ferret.

==== Muzzle dispersion ====
This method is the simplest: the chemical agent is in the form of a loose powder, which is expelled by the propellant of the cartridge. These rounds are used at short range, and have effect from the muzzle to a range of about 30 feet. This method is best used by operators wearing gas masks, as the chemical agent can easily be blown towards the operator.

==== Canister projectiles ====
These are also called gas grenades, and are used at longer ranges. They are analogous to rifle grenades, providing increased accuracy and range over hand-thrown gas grenades. Gas grenades may be used by operators without gas masks, as the agent is only dispersed in the area of impact, as far away as 150 yards (140 m). The agent in gas grenades is dispersed as a gas or an aerosol spray.

==== Ferret rounds ====
These are specialized gas grenades designed to penetrate light barriers, such as windows, hollow core doors, and interior walls, and disperse chemical agents on the far side.

=== Impact rounds ===
Impact rounds come in a variety of shapes, sizes and compositions for varying roles. Impact rounds are made out of materials of much lower density than the lead normally used in bullets, are larger, and are fired at lower velocities. Rounds are designed with low mass, moderate velocity, and large surface area to prevent the rounds from penetrating the skin significantly or causing severe injury, so they merely provide a painful blow to the target: but instances have been reported where rubber or plastic bullets have caused significant injuries to the body or eyes, and in some cases caused death.

One broad classification of impact rounds is direct fire and indirect fire rounds. Direct fire rounds can be fired directly at the target, ideally targeted low on the target, away from vital organs that are more prone to damage from the impact.

==== Baton rounds ====
Baton rounds, often called rubber bullets or plastic bullets, are cylinders made of rubber, plastic, wood, or foam, and can be as large as the full bore diameter of the launcher. Smaller baton rounds may be encased in a shell casing or other housing. Baton rounds may fire one long baton, or several shorter batons. Harder or denser baton rounds are intended for skip fire, while softer or less dense batons are intended for direct fire. Baton rounds are the subject of significant controversy, due to extensive use by British and Israeli forces, resulting in a number of avoidable fatalities.

==== Beanbag rounds ====
Beanbag rounds consist of a tough fabric bag filled with birdshot. The bag is flexible enough to flatten on impact, covering a large surface area, and they are used for direct fire. Beanbag rounds may be wide and flat, designed for close range use, or elliptical in shape, with a fabric tail to provide drag stabilization, for longer range use.

==== Rubber buckshot ====
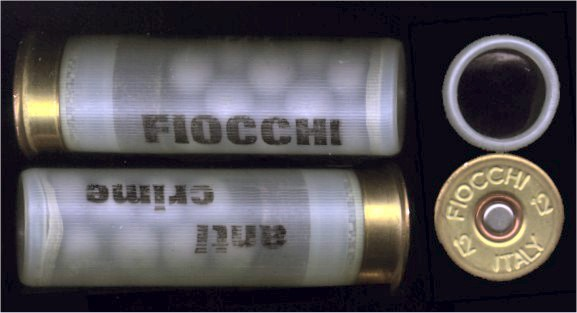
Two rounds of Fiocchi 12 gauge rubber buckshot

These, also called stinger rounds, consist of a number of rubber balls ranging from around 0.32 to 0.60 inches (8.1 to 15.2 mm) in diameter, and are used for direct fire. The small diameter means that each ball contains far less energy than a baton round, but it also limits the range. Rubber slugs, used in 12 gauge firearms, consist of a fin stabilized full bore diameter rubber projectile. These are used for long range, accurate direct fire shots on individual targets.

==== PepperBall rounds ====
PepperBall rounds, also known as PepperBall projectiles, are a patented impact sphere that is filled with either PAVA or an inert powder. PepperBall projectiles are deployed by air powered launchers and are similar in theory to a paintball marker. The term is not interchangeable with other projectiles on the market, as PepperBall, pepper ball, and pepperball are trademarked terms.

The PAVA in a PepperBall projectile is a pharmaceutical grade organic irritant and is based on one of the hottest of the six Capsaicinoids found in pepper plants. Capsaicin and Pelargonic Acid Vanillylamide (aka “PAVA”) are the hottest of the six Capsaicinoids and are equal in heat value.

PAVA has other names:

- Pelargonylvanillylamide
- Nonivamide
- Capsaicin II
- Synthetic capsaicin

== Types of less-lethal launchers ==
Purpose-built launchers are commonly large bore guns, formerly 25 to 27 mm (0.98 to 1.06 inches), modern versions are 37 to 40 mm (1.46 to 1.57 inches). Dual-purpose guns are usually 12 gauge (18.5 mm/.729 inches) riot shotguns, firing special less-lethal shotgun shells.

Single-shot large bore launchers, such as the Milkor 37/38mm and 40mm Stopper, M79 grenade launcher, ARWEN ACE, and RGS-50M, are generally break open designs. The barrels are relatively short, resulting in a carbine sized gun, and may have a shoulder stock and/or a forward handgrip to provide greater control. Pistol launchers exist, but are generally only used for short range, muzzle dispersing chemical agents.

Multishot large-bore launchers, such as the ARWEN 37, are usually in the form of a revolver holding five or six rounds in the cylinder. Unlike normal revolvers, the cylinder of a revolving riot gun is too massive to be turned easily by the trigger pull, and is usually turned by a pre-tensioned spring or by a pump action.

Shotguns used for riot control are nearly always in 12 gauge, as that is the gauge in which nearly all riot control rounds are made. Generally riot shotguns are used, such as some models of the Remington 870 and Mossberg 500. Due to the reduced power of riot control rounds, there is insufficient energy to cycle the actions of gas operated and recoil operated firearms, so riot shotguns are manually operated, usually pump action. The advantage of using a riot shotgun for riot control is that the shotgun is a dual use firearm, and can switch quickly to and from the riot control role by changing the ammunition. The downside is that it can fire lethal projectiles, and so extra care must be taken in its use to prevent the wrong ammunition from being used.

A less lethal projectile gun, an example of which is the FN 303, is essentially a paintball marker, either purpose built for riot control, or modified from a commercial paintball marker. The pepper ball guns use special pepper spray ammunition based on paintball technology, consisting of a gelatin capsule filled with the riot control agent. The guns use compressed gas and provide semiautomatic fire, and the pepperballs act just like paintballs, fracturing on impact and splattering the chemical agent on impact. These can be used for direct fire, to break the balls on the target, or indirect fire, breaking near the target and spraying the agent into the target's vicinity.

Police have been known to use paintball guns loaded with paint projectiles, to mark particular rioters so that police can easily identify and arrest them later.

Some weapons discharge teargas as a solution in water.

== Legal issues ==
Large-bore launchers are classified as firearms in most countries. Shotguns intended for riot use are semi-automatic shotguns subject to relevant regulations. Riot control ammunition may be restricted in various jurisdictions, to a lesser or greater degree than normal shotgun shells.

=== United States ===
In the U.S. large-bore launchers are subject to BATFE regulations. Since firearms over .50 caliber (12.7 mm) with rifled barrels are considered destructive devices under the National Firearms Act, only smoothbore riot guns may be sold to civilians without an NFA permit; a common form found on the civilian market are M203 grenade launcher replicas, which can be used to fire 37 mm practice rounds. The 40 mm guns are usually rifled, and may fire 40 mm grenades; explosive grenades rely on the spin both for stabilization and for arming the fuze.

== Lethality ==
Riot guns have been documented to be lethal in some cases, with the use of an FN 303 by the Boston Police Department in October 2004 resulting in the fatal shooting of Victoria Snelgrove being one such incident.

== Types ==
| Name | Caliber | Capacity | Notes |
|---|---|---|---|
| ARWEN 37 | 37 mm | 5 | drum magazine |
| ARWEN 37S "Shorty" CQB | 37 mm | 5 | Short barrel, no stock, drum magazine |
| ARWEN ACE | | 1 | single shot, telescoping stock |
| CM-55 gas gun | 37 mm | 1 | |
| Cobray 37 mm launcher | 37 mm | 1 | aluminum barrel, retractable stock |
| Defense Technology 37 mm Launcher | 37 mm | model dependant | single-shot and multi-shot versions |
| DPMS M-37 flare launcher | 37 mm | 1 | |
| Federal Labs 37 mm rotary gas gun | 37 mm | 6 | rotary drum magazine, top-folding stock |
| Federal Labs 37 mm single-shot Federal Riot Gun | 37 mm | 1 | |
| FN 303 | 18 mm | 15 | drum magazine |
| Greener Police Gun Mark I | | | Manufactured by W. W. Greener. Greener Guns were used throughout the British Empire. Dates most of the 20th Century |
| Greener Police Gun Mark II | | | Manufactured by W. W. Greener. Greener Guns were used throughout the British Empire. Dates most of the 20th Century |
| Greener Police Gun Mark III | | | Manufactured by W. W. Greener. Greener Guns were used throughout the British Empire. Dates most of the 20th Century |
| Heckler & Koch launcher | 37 mm | 1 | retractable stock |
| Hilton multi-purpose gun | 37 mm | 1 | |
| M203 grenade launcher | 40 mm | 1 | underslung attachment for rifles |
| M79 grenade launcher | 40 mm | 1 | break-action |
| MGL-MK1 40 mm multi-launcher | 40 mm | 6 | rotary drum magazine |
| Milkor Stopper 37/38 mm riot gun | 37/38 mm | 1 | break-action |
| MK40 40 mm under barrel launcher | 40 mm | 1 | fits under rifle barrel |
| MSRG-38 | 37 mm | 6 | rotary magazine |
| Ramo RT 37 | 37 mm | 1 | |
| MK40 40 mm under barrel launcher | 40 mm | 1 | fits under rifle barrel |
| RGM-40 | 40 mm | 1 | stand alone version of GP-30 grenade launcher |
| RGS-50M | 50 mm | 1 | break action, specialized rounds such as door breakers |
| Sage Control Ordnance SL1 | 37 mm | 1 | |
| Sage Control Ordnance SL6 | 37 mm | 6 | rotary magazine |
| TW73 | | 1 | breech loading |
| Webley Schermuly | 37 mm | 1 | |
| Narendra Explosives Limited | 38/40 mm | model dependant | single-shot and multi-shot variants |
| RWGŁ-3 | 50mm | 1 | can use a net adapter, uses tear gas grenades |
| AWGŁ-3 | 50mm | 5 | box magazine, fully automatic, mostly mounted on vehicles |

== See also ==
- Traumatic pistol
