= Federal Laboratories =

American firearm manufacturer

- Industry: Firearms
- Founded: pre 1930
- Defunct: 1994
- Headquarters: Pittsburgh, United States

Federal Laboratories (often FedLabs or Federal Labs) was a US firearms manufacturer, established in Pittsburgh in the early part of the 20th century, that produced tear gas and less-lethal riot guns, including the Federal Riot Gun. (Note: This article is about a historic US company operated as Federal Laboratories, not any current company operating under that name, such as Federal Laboratories)

The company was sold in 1994, eventually becoming part of BAE Systems, and has not operated as a separate brand since that time.

== History of use ==
=== Civil order in the United States ===
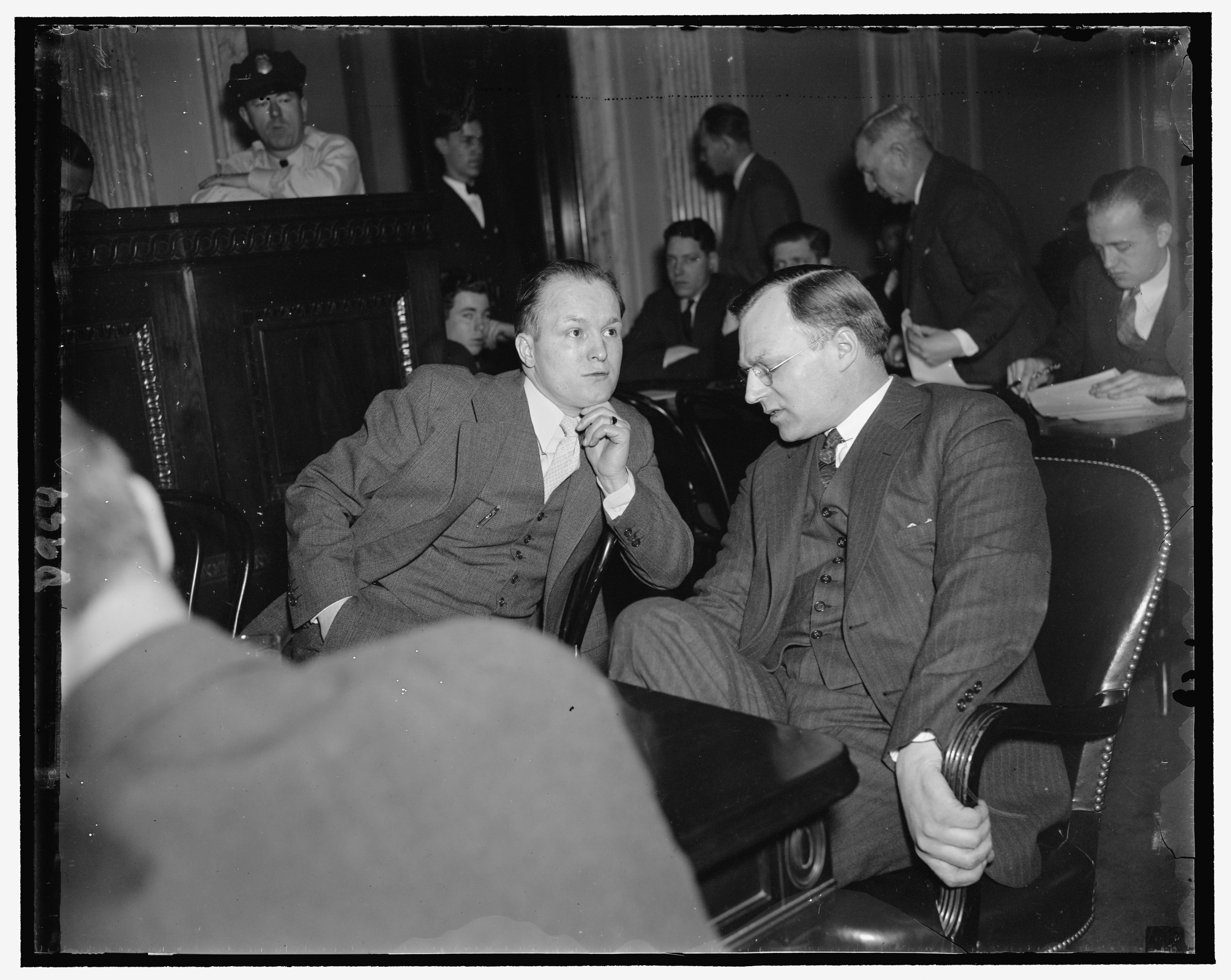
John W. Young (right), president of Federal Laboratories, confers with his secretary during testimony before the La Follette Civil Rights Committee of the United States Senate (March 1937)

In the 1930s, custom gas guns by FedLabs were adopted by the New York dept of prisons, following a sales pitch made before the APA by the president of FedLabs in Baltimore in 1931.

Also in the 1930s, Federal Laboratories actively worked to sell gas guns for the purpose of strikebreaking. One FedLabs representative fired a tear gas grenade during the 1934 West Coast waterfront strike that caused the death of a striker due to skull fracture. Auerbach notes, however, that despite FedLabs stated opposition to "communist" strikers, the firm continued to sell tear gas to the Soviet Union even during 1933.

=== World War II ===
During World War II, the company's factory near Saltsburg, PA along Tunnelton Road employed women to replace drafted male workers. There the women produced "incendiary magnesium powder bombs, grenades and other munitions", including FedLabs tear gas grenades.

=== Northern Ireland ===
The single shot FRG became the standard riot gun used extensively by the British Army throughout The Troubles in Northern Ireland.

=== Israel ===
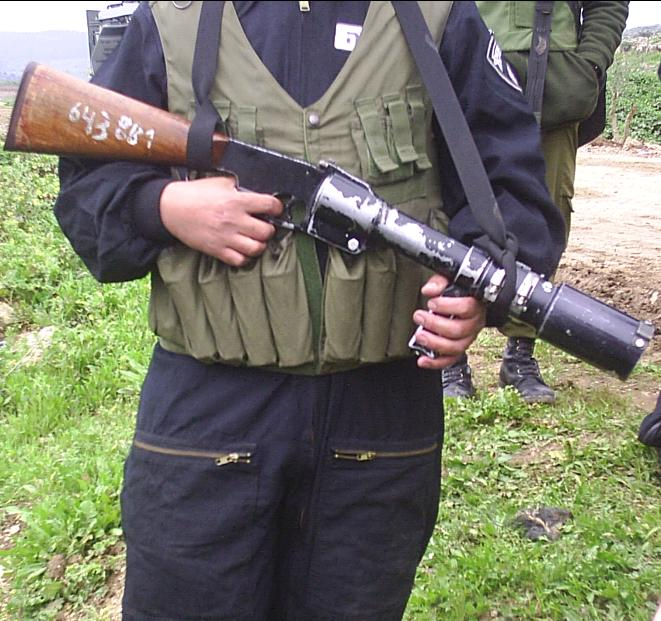
Israeli border guard with a Federal M201-Z riot gas gun

FedLabs gas guns, and CS and CN grenades, were imported by Israel for use in the Palestinian Territories; in 1988 FedLabs discontinued sales of CS and CN to Israel following multiple reports of abusive use of the products.

=== 2011 Bahraini protests ===
Inspired by the regional Arab Spring, Bahrain's Shia majority started large protests against its Sunni rulers in early 2011. The government launched a crackdown on the opposition that included conducting thousands of arrests and systematic torture. Almost daily clashes between protesters and security forces led to dozens of deaths.

According to Physicians for Human Rights, 34 of these deaths were related to government usage of tear gas originally manufactured by U.S.-based Federal Laboratories.

== Sale and fate ==
In March 1994, TransTechnology sold FedLabs to Mace Security International, which subsequently sold the company in 1998 to Armor Holdings. Armor holdings was in turn acquired by BAE Systems in 2007.
