= ARWEN ACE =

- Type: Less lethal launcher
- Place of origin: United Kingdom

Service history
- Used by: Military and law enforcement worldwide

Production history
- Designer: Royal Ordnance Factories / Royal Ordnance plc
- Designed: 1987
- Manufacturer: Police Ordnance Company Inc.
- Variants: ARWEN ACE S, ARWEN ACE T

Specifications
- Mass: 2.07kg / 4lb, 9oz
- Length: 730–860mm (29–34 inch)
- Cartridge: proprietary 37mm ARWEN rebated cartridge
- Cartridge weight: munition type dependent
- Caliber: 37mm
- Barrels: one rifled barrel
- Action: Single Shot, Auto-Ejection
- Muzzle velocity: munition type dependent
- Effective firing range: munition type dependent
- Maximum firing range: 100 meters / 109.36 yards
- Sights: integrated leaf sights

The ARWEN ACE is a breech-loaded less-lethal launcher which fires a variety of 37mm less-lethal munitions which includes direct impact batons, chemical irritant delivery munitions and smoke delivery munitions.

"ARWEN" is an acronym for "anti riot weapon enfield".

As of 2001, all ARWEN trademarks and patents are owned by Police Ordnance Company Inc. The launcher is manufactured under license in Canada.

== Munition types ==
The ARWEN ACE is part of a less lethal system which incorporates a variety of less lethal munitions which can be deployed through the same launcher.

The AR-1 munition consists of a proprietary polymer baton which is intended to be deployed at living tissue as a means of inflicting blunt force trauma through direct impact at ranges up to 100 meters / 109.36 yards.

The AR-2 munition consists of an aluminum canister which is intended to deploy a large quantity of pyrotechnic smoke along with a payload of chemical irritant in the form of micronized CS.

The AR-3 munition consists of a proprietary polymer baton which is intended to be deployed at living tissue as a means of inflicting blunt force trauma through direct impact at ranges up to 100 meters / 109.36 yards. Unlike the AR-1 munition, the AR-3 also contains a discrete payload of chemical irritant in the form of CS or OC powder which are intended to contaminate the target when struck.

The AR-4 munition consists of an aluminum canister which is intended to deploy a large quantity of pyrotechnic smoke suitable for screening purposes in a variety of colours.

The AR-5 munition consists of a composite plastic projectile which is intended to be fired at a physical obstruction such as a window, door or other barricade. The munition is designed to penetrate and pass through the obstruction at which time it deploys a payload of chemical irritant in the form of micronized CS or OC.

The AR-6 munition consists of either OC or CS chemical irritant powder which is immediately dispersed through the muzzle of the ARWEN when fired and designed to immediately contaminate an individual or area through blast dispersion

Munitions manufactured by companies other than Police Ordnance Company Inc. void the manufacturer warranty and can lead to damage to ARWEN launchers.

== See also ==
- ARWEN 37
