= Peel Regional Police Pipe Band =

Canadian pipe band organization

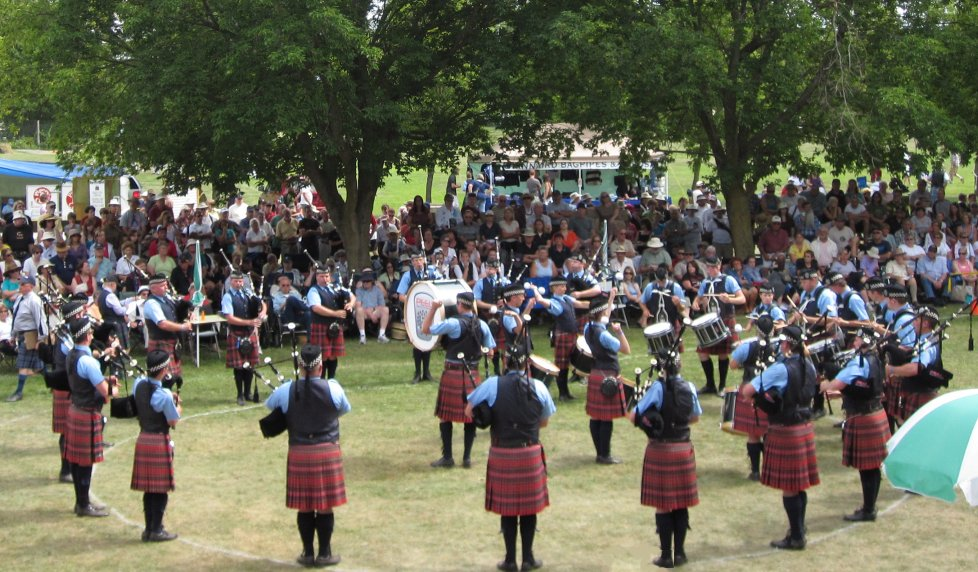
- Location: Mississauga, Ontario, Canada
- Grade: 2,3,4 & 5
- Pipe major: Mike Allegretti
- Drum sergeant: Cameron Mckail
- Tartan: Red MacPherson (Modern)
- Notable honours: North American Champions: Grade 1: 2010, 2011, 2012, 2013; Grade 2: 2019, 2022, 2023 Grade 5: 2022 PPBSO Champions Supreme: Grade 1: 2010, 2011, 2012, 2013; Grade 2: 2018, 2019, 2022, 2023

The Peel Regional Police Pipe Band is a Canadian pipe band organization based in Mississauga, Ontario, Canada.

== History ==
The band was formed in 1976. The band's Pipe Major is Mike Allegretti; the lead drummer is Cameron McKail; and the mid-section leader is Colin McKail. In 2002, the band accompanied Paul McCartney during his song "Mull of Kintyre" at a concert at the Air Canada Centre in Toronto.

From 2010 to 2014, Peel dominated the grade 1 field, finishing as North American Champions and PPBSO Champion Supreme in each of those years. However, following police restructuring in the fall of 2014, the band was no longer able to use highly qualified long-distance players. This severely impacted the band’s performance standard and relegated the band to, or near, the bottom of grade 1 standings in Ontario, as well as at the World Pipe Band Championships. As a result, in the fall of 2017, the band was downgraded to grade 2 by the RSPBA. The band leadership immediately embraced this decision and saw it as an opportunity to restructure the organization, to develop new local players, and to establish a multi-level teaching program.

In 2018, in order to develop prospective players, a new Developmental Program was added to the organization. Since then, the grade 2 band has finished as North American Champions and PPBSO Champion Supreme winners in 3 of the 4 years that competitions were held (due to COVID). The band has close to 100 members in multiple levels within the organization.

- The senior level (the grade 2 band) has more than 40 members, with over 90% of the members now being local
- There are also 4 training levels within the band’s developmental program (very much like a farm team in a sports organization) that train prospective players:
  - a teaching program for new players
  - a grade 5 competitive band
  - a grade 4 competitive band
  - a grade 3 competitive band

The majority of members are volunteers who travel to practice every week from all over Ontario, with the average band member driving 90 minutes each way just to get to practice. The band continues to exist thanks to the ongoing support of the Peel Regional Police and Chief Nishan Duraiappah. Each year, the band participates in several events on behalf of the Peel Regional Police, which include:

- Ontario Police Memorial at Queen's Park and the National Peace Officers’ Memorial on Parliament Hill in Ottawa.
- Recruit graduation ceremonies
- Awards and promotion ceremonies
- Community events

== Pipe Majors ==
- Michael Grey (1995-1999)
- John Elliott (1993-1994, 2000-2006)
- Glenn Brown (2007-2008)
- John Cairns (2009–2025)
- Mike Allegretti (2025-Present)

== Lead Drummers ==
- Drew Duthart (2000)
- Doug Stronach (2001-2003)
- Craig Stewart (2004-2007)
- Graham Brown (2008-2012)
- Graham Kirkwood (2013-2016)
- Harvey Dawson (2016–2023)
- Cameron McKail (2024-present)

"Kirkwood resigns as Peel Police L-D".

== Discography ==
- Walking the Beat (1997)
- Fever (2011)
