= Hamilton Paramedic Service =

Emergency medical services provider in Canada

City of Hamilton Paramedic Service (formerly Hamilton EMS)
- Motto: Protect and Promote Quality of Life and Public Safety
- Headquarters: Hamilton, Ontario
- Employees: Approx. 500
- BLS or ALS: Both ALS and BLS
- Ambulances: 47
- Chief: Russell Crocker
- Medical director: Dr. Paul Miller
- Responses: Approx. 75,000
- Website: www.hamilton.ca/ems

Hamilton Paramedic Service is the designated service provider for emergency medical services (ambulance) in the City of Hamilton, Ontario.

Additional vehicles are occasionally added as a temporary measure as demand increases. Hamilton EMS operates from 18 joint EMS/fire stations, and two EMS exclusive operation centres.

== Paramedic Stations ==
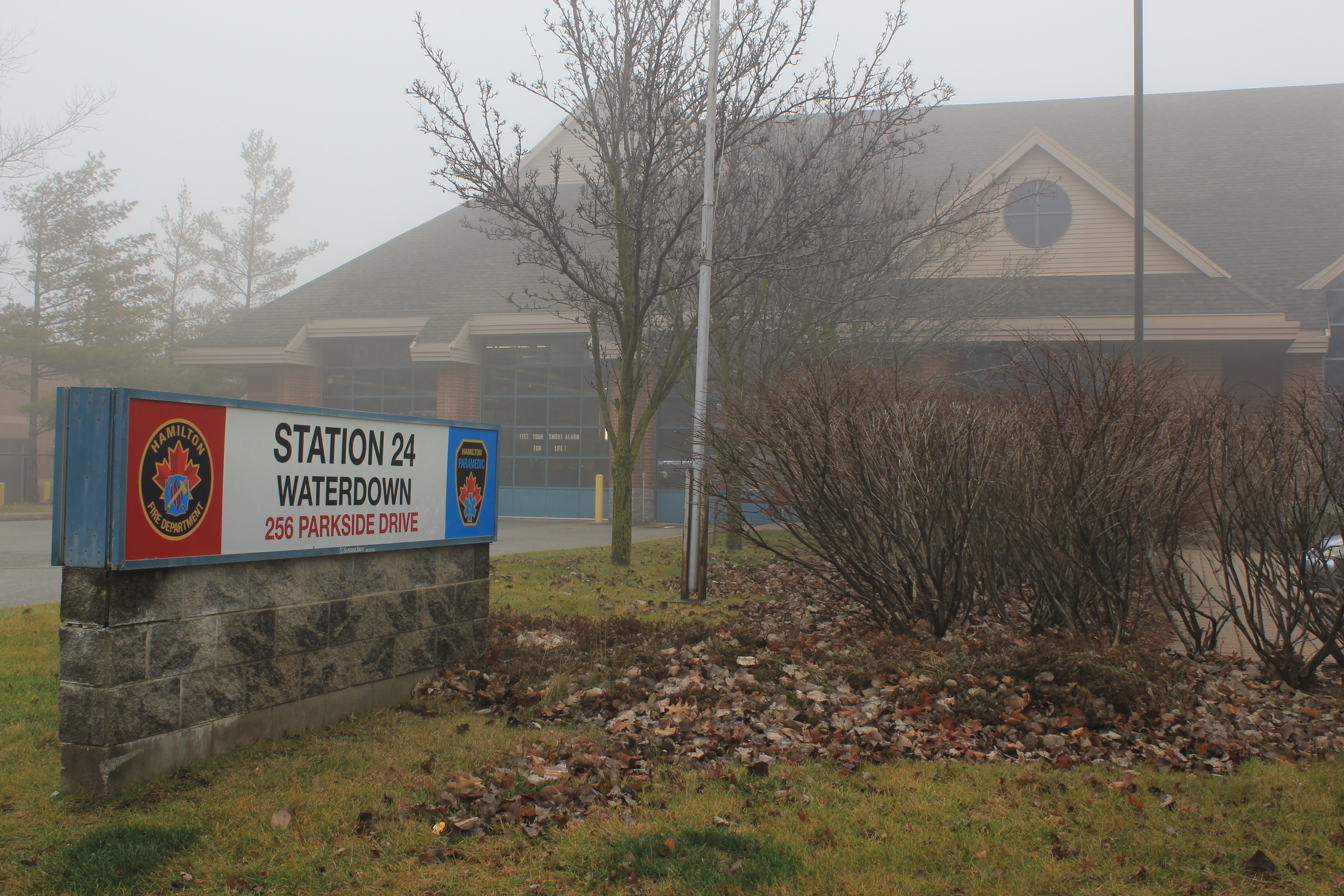
Station #24 Waterdown

- Station #1 JOHN - 35 - 43 John Street North Transport Unit 2005 ALS and Transport Unit 2011
- Station #3 GARTH - 965 Garth Street. Transport Unit 2547 ALS and Demand 2015.
- Station #4 UPPER SHERMAN - 729 Upper Sherman Avenue. Transport Unit 2547 ALS and Demand 2032.
- Station #7 QUIGLEY - 225 Quigley Road. Transport Unit 2547 ALS and Demand 2004.
- Station #9 KENILWORTH - 125 Kenilworth Avenue North. Transport Unit 2546 ALS and Demand 2541.
- Station #10 NORFOLK - 1455 Main Street West. Transport Unit 2012 ALS
- Station #12 STONEY CREEK - 199 Highway 8, Hamilton. Transport Unit 2008 ALS
- Station #15 ARVIN - 415 Arvin Avenue, Stoney Creek. Transport Unit 2027 and Transport Unit 2036 ALS ERV 2350
- Station #17 ISAAC BROCK - 363 Isaac Brock Drive. Transport Unit 2543 ALS
- Station #18 BINBROOK - 2636 Highway #56, Binbrook. Transport Unit 2035 ALS
- Station #19 MOUNT HOPE - 3303 Homestead Drive, Mount Hope Transport Unit 2010
- Station #20 ANCASTER/GARNER - 661 Garner Road East, Ancaster. Transport Unit 2021 ALS.
- Station #21 ANCASTER/WILSON - 365 Wilson St. West, Ancaster. Transport Unit 2007 ALS.
- Station #23 DUNDAS - Memorial Square, Dundas. Unit Transport Unit 2094 ALS, Demand 2003.
- Station #24 WATERDOWN - 256 Parkside Drive, Waterdown. Transport Unit 2540, Demand 2031.
- Station #25 GREENSVILLE - 361 Old Brock Road, Hamilton. Transport Unit 2038
- Station #32 LIMERIDGE - 1000 Limeridge Rd East. Transport Unit 2034 ALS and 2037, 2009, ALS District 2 Supervisor, District 2 Emergency Support Unit
- Station #30 VICTORIA/FLEET- 489 Victoria Avenue North Transport Unit Multiples (24/7) and Multiple Demand Transport Units (Stores) Logistics Supervisor, District 1 Supervisors 2382 2381 2383 2385, Scheduling Offices, Logistic Technicians, Bariatric Unit 2256 & 2255, District 1 Emergency Support Unit. **Paramedics in Hamilton utilize stations with the Hamilton Fire Department.

== Services ==
- Primary Care Paramedics (PCPs)
- Advanced Care Paramedics (ACPs)
- Land Transport Ambulances
- Emergency Response Vehicles/Paramedic Rapid Response Units
- Emergency Support - Mass Casualty Units
- Tiered Emergency Medical Responses (with Hamilton Fire Department)
- Community Paramedicine Program
- Remote Patient Monitoring
- Social Navigator Program
- Bariatric Transport Unit
- Neo Natal Transport Team
- Public Access Defibrillation (PAD) program
- Community Programs - Public education and safety promotion

== Transport Destinations ==
Hamilton Paramedic Service transports patients to Hamilton General Hospital, Juravinski Hospital (formerly Henderson Hospital), St. Joseph's Healthcare Hamilton or McMaster Children's Hospital/McMaster University Medical Centre. Patient's transported by ambulance are not accepted at Urgent Care Centres in Hamilton^{[1]}

== Communications ==
Hamilton Paramedic Service operates under the direction of Hamilton Central Ambulance Communications Center or CACC "Kaack"). CACC is operated by the Ministry of Health Emergency Health Services Branch and is not operated/owned/controlled by the City of Hamilton.

Emergency calls to 9-1-1 are first answered by the local PSAP or Public Safety Answering Point. If an ambulance is required you are then connected/transferred via 9-1-1 to the Hamilton Central Ambulance Communications Center if you are calling locally.

CACC prioritizes the urgency of requests, determine the appropriate destination hospital to meet patient needs and provide callers with pre-arrival first aid instructions. The centres deploy, coordinate and direct the movement of all ambulances and emergency response vehicles within geographic catchment areas to ensure an integrated healthcare system. Computer-aided wide-area central dispatching and technology, such as automatic vehicle location using global positioning systems, help the dispatcher to determine and assign the closest available and most appropriate ambulance to each emergency.

== See also ==
Paramedicine in Canada

- List of EMS Services in Ontario
- Paramedics in Canada
- Emergency Medical Services in Canada

Emergency Services in Hamilton, Ontario

- Hamilton Police Service (Ontario)
