= TW73 =

The TW73 is a teargas grenade gun. It is now called the Mehrzweckwerfer (General Purpose Thrower) MZW 73/91 because there is now other ammunition than teargas grenades like rubber shot bullets available. It was developed in Switzerland, based on the K31 bolt-action rifle. It was developed originally for use against anti-nuclear-power demonstrators who were occupying areas. All Swiss police corps and the Swiss Army use it.

It is 80 cm (31.5 in) long, weighs 5 kg (11 lb), can fire 6–10 shots per minute. Range is 180 m (600 ft) (160 m or 520 ft with the older shells). The range can be shortened by turning a ring which lets part of the propulsion gases escape.
