= 37 mm flare =

Specification for ammunition

37 mm flare or "1.5 inch" caliber is the specification for a common launching system for non-lethal and less-lethal ammunition. Such launchers are also often known as "gas guns" due to their original use by police for launching tear gas projectiles. 37 mm systems are typically smoothbore as rifling is unnecessary or even detrimental to the performance of the usual projectiles.

37 mm rounds can be fired from a variety of devices, including standalone launchers, and M203-style launchers mounted on rifles using clamping systems or rail mounting systems.

== United States legality ==
In the United States, 37 mm launchers are exempted from the National Firearms Act of 1934 so long as no anti-personnel rounds are in the user's possession. Only non-anti-personnel rounds may be possessed or used. Such rounds include:

- flares
- smoke rounds, to include irritating "smoke" such as CS or OC agents
- noise effect ("bird bomb") rounds

Where anti-personnel rounds are to be fired from a 37 mm launcher, the launcher must be registered with the BATFE as a destructive device. Possession of a destructive device is also restricted or banned by some local and state laws. The specific wording of the BATFE rule is:

ATF Ruling 95-3:
37/38 mm gas/flare guns possessed with cartridges containing wood pellets, rubber pellets or balls, or bean bags are classified as destructive devices for purposes of the Gun Control Act, 18 U.S.C. Chapter 44, and the National Firearms Act, 26 U.S.C. Chapter 53.

Rounds that are considered anti-personnel include:

Less-lethal rounds:

- rounds loaded with rubber pellets
- rounds loaded with plastic or wooden batons
- bean bag rounds consisting of a cloth bag filled with lead pellets

Lethal rounds:

- buckshot
- flechette rounds

Such rounds are not considered destructive devices, but are not readily available to non-government purchasers.

A round containing an explosive payload of over 0.25 ounces (7.1 g) would itself be classified as a destructive device, requiring BATFE registration.

A personally constructed (D.I.Y) 37mm launcher may be made at home (see list of 3D printed weapons and parts or homemade firearm for more information), and does not need to be registered as a firearm or a destructive device, as is the case for factory-made launcher devices. Likewise, you cannot possess or use 37mm anti-personnel ammunition or you will have to register the launcher platform as a destructive device per BATFE ruling.

== See also ==
- Glossary of firearms terms
- 40 mm grenade
- Riot gun
- Title II weapons
