= ARWEN 37 =

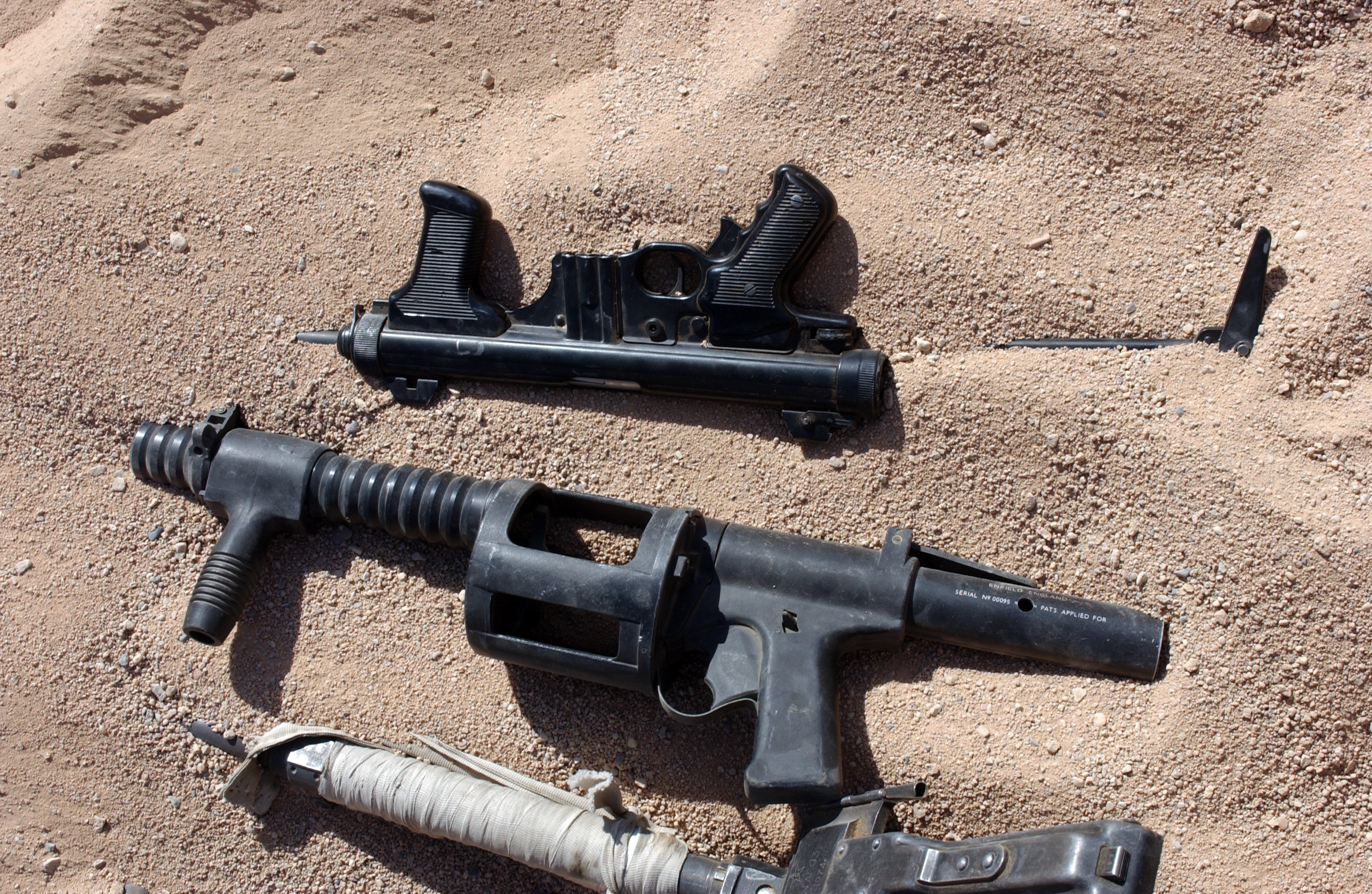
- ARWEN 37 (center)
- Type: Less-lethal Launcher
- Place of origin: United Kingdom

Service history
- Used by: Military and Law Enforcement worldwide

Production history
- Designer: Norman Trevor Brint, Design Team Lead
- Designed: 1977 to 1979
- Manufacturer: Police Ordnance Company Inc.
- Produced: 1979
- Variants: ARWEN 37S, ARWEN 37T

Specifications
- Mass: 3.46 kg (7 lb 10 oz)
- Length: 710–795 m (28,000–31,300 in)
- Cartridge: proprietary 37mm ARWEN rebated cartridge
- Cartridge weight: munition type dependent
- Caliber: 37 mm
- Barrels: 5 grooves, 1 in 540 mm / 21.3 in Right Hand Twist rifling
- Rate of fire: 5 munitions in 4 seconds
- Muzzle velocity: munition type dependent
- Effective firing range: munition type dependent
- Maximum firing range: 100 meters (110 yards)
- Feed system: 5 shot rotary magazine
- Sights: integrated leaf sights

The ARWEN 37 is a less-lethal launcher which fires a variety of 37mm less-lethal munitions which includes direct impact batons, chemical irritant delivery munitions and smoke delivery munitions. The ARWEN 37 has 5-round rotary drum magazine.

== History ==
In 1977 the British government directed their Royal Small Arms Factory (RSAF) Enfield, then part of the Royal Ordnance Factories, to develop a weapon for effective crowd control that would outperform existing weapon systems.

By 1979 a design team led by Norman Trevor Brint designed three prototypes for consideration:

- The Enfield XL75E1, which incorporated a pump action
- The Enfield XL76E1, which incorporated a rotary magazine capable of holding five rounds
- The Enfield XL77E1, which incorporated a semi automatic box style magazine

After initial testing it was the Enfield XL76E1 which was chosen for further development. As almost all weapons designed or produced at the Royal Small Arms Factory incorporate the letters EN or the word Enfield into their name, and the fact that it featured a 37mm barrel, the Enfield XL76E1 was officially designated the ARWEN 37 (Anti Riot Weapon ENfield).

General production of the first generation of the ARWEN 37, the Mk I, began in 1984 in Enfield, England.

The second generation of the ARWEN 37, the Mk II, were produced in Nottingham, England.

In 2001, all ARWEN trademarks and patents were acquired by the Canadian Police Ordnance Company Inc., who began production of the third generation, or Mk III, variety of the ARWEN 37. The launcher is currently manufactured under license in Canada.

== Design ==
Unlike many 37mm launchers which have a smooth bore, the ARWEN 37 features a rifled barrel.

The launcher features a revolver like rotary magazine which holds five munitions and which allows for a rate of fire of five rounds in four seconds without reloading. The rotary magazine can be manually unloaded or topped up by the user at any time in a rapid manner.

Many ARWEN 37 parts are constructed of anodized aluminum or proprietary polymer so that the overall weight of the launcher can be kept to an absolute minimum.

Because of their unique design, ARWEN munitions (rounds) act as the chamber for the launcher when it is fired. This means that the rotary magazine housing can be designed in such a way that the user can easily look inside of the launcher and instantly identify how many and what type of munitions have been loaded into it, an important safety feature.

== Munition Types ==
The ARWEN 37 is part of a less lethal system which incorporates a variety of less lethal munitions which can be deployed through the same launcher.

The AR-1 munition consists of a proprietary polymer baton which is intended to be deployed at living tissue as a means of inflicting blunt force trauma through direct impact at ranges up to 100 meters (110 yards).

The AR-2 munition consists of an aluminum canister which is intended to deploy a large quantity of pyrotechnic smoke along with a payload of chemical irritant in the form of micronized CS.

The AR-3 munition consists of a proprietary polymer baton which is intended to be deployed at living tissue as a means of inflicting blunt force trauma through direct impact at ranges up to 100 meters (110 yards)Unlike the AR-1 munition, the AR-3 also contains a discrete payload of chemical irritant in the form of CS or OC powder which are intended to contaminate the target when struck.

The AR-4 munition consists of an aluminum canister which is intended to deploy a large quantity of pyrotechnic smoke suitable for screening purposes in a variety of colours.

The AR-5 munition consists of a composite plastic projectile which is intended to be fired at a physical obstruction such as a window, door or other barricade. The munition is designed to penetrate and pass through the obstruction at which time it deploys a payload of chemical irritant in the form of micronized CS or OC.

The AR-6 munition consists of either OC or CS chemical irritant powder which is immediately dispersed through the muzzle of the ARWEN when fired and designed to immediately contaminate an individual or area through blast dispersion.

== See also ==
- ARWEN ACE
