= List of grenade launchers =

This is a list of grenade launchers.

== Single grenade launcher ==
Name	Manufacturer	Image	Cartridge	Country	Year	Note
AG-40			40 mm grenade	Romania	1986	Designed to mount on the PA md. 86 rifle
ARDE 40 mm UBGL	Ordnance Factory Tiruchirappalli		40 mm grenade	India	2010	
Bren CZ 805 G1	Česká zbrojovka Uherský Brod		40 mm grenade	Czech Republic	2011	Developed for the Bren 805 A1/A2 rifle
BS-1 Tishina	TsNIITochMash		30×29mm grenade	Soviet Union	1970	
China Lake Grenade Launcher	China Lake Naval Weapons Center		40 mm grenade	United States	1967	
Davidson Hand Howitzer	Sirocco Engineering Works; Munitions Inventions Departments			United Kingdom	1917	
EAGLE grenade launcher	Colt Canada		40 mm grenade	Canada	2016	
Enhanced Grenade Launcher Module	FN Herstal		40 mm grenade	Belgium	2004	Updated version of the GL1 for use with the FN SCAR family of rifles and stand-alone use
GL06	Brügger & Thomet		40 mm grenade	Switzerland	2006	
GL1 grenade launcher	FN Herstal		40 mm grenade	Belgium	2001	Designed for use with the FN F2000 rifle
GL 40	Steyr Arms		40 mm grenade	Austria	2009	SL40 variant adopted by the Australian Defence Force
GLX 160	Beretta S.p.A.		40 mm grenade	Italy	2008	
GM-94	KBP Instrument Design Bureau		43 mm grenade	Russia	1990s	
GP-25	KBP Instrument Design Bureau		40 mm grenade	Soviet Union	1966	
GP-30 GP-34	KBP Instrument Design Bureau		40 mm grenade	Soviet Union	1989	
HK AG36	Heckler & Koch		40 mm grenade	Germany	2002	Grenade launcher for the HK G36
HK AG-C/EGLM	Heckler & Koch		40 mm grenade	Germany	2000s	Used with the Diemaco C7 and C8 in the Netherlands Army, with the SA80 (named L123) in the British Army
HK69A1	Heckler & Koch		40 mm grenade	West Germany	1960s	Grenade launcher usable on its own or with the H&K G3 (named HK79 in this configuration)
IWI X95 GL40	Israel Weapon Industries		40 mm grenade	Israel	2009	Grenade launcher for the X95 and Galil ACE rifles
K201 (grenade launcher)	SNT Motiv		40 mm grenade	South Korea	1990s	
HK269	Heckler & Koch		40 mm grenade	Germany	2000s	Variant of the AG-C with a shorter barrel for the HK 416 and the HK 417
M79 grenade launcher	Springfield Armory; Action Manufacturing Company; Kanarr Corporation; Thompson-Ramo-Wooldridge		40 mm grenade	United States	1953	
M203 grenade launcher	Colt's Manufacturing Company		40 mm grenade	United States	1967	
M203XX RAMBO (Rapid Additively Manufactured Ballistics Ordnance)	ARDEC / Picatinny Arsenal		40 mm grenade	United States	2017	3D-Printed prototype by the US Army
M320 Grenade Launcher Module	Heckler & Koch		40 mm grenade	Germany	2008	Replaces the M203 in the US Army
M7/M8 grenade launcher	Springfield Armory			United States	1943	M7 and variants for the M1 Garand rifle, M8 for the M1 carbine
MAHG K 218	—		—	—	18th century	
Milkor 37/38mm and 40mm Stopper	Milkor (Pty) Ltd		37 mm flare 38 mm grenade 40 mm grenade (All less-lethal rounds)	South Africa	1981	
Milkor 40 mm UBGL grenade launcher	Milkor (Pty) Ltd		40 mm grenade	South Africa	2010s	
Norinco LG2	Norinco		40 mm grenade	China	20??	
Northover Projector	—		2.5-inch	United Kingdom	1940	
OPL-40M	Z111 Factory		40×46mm NATO	Vietnam	2010	
Pallad wz. 1974	Zakłady Mechaniczne Tarnów		40 mm grenade	Poland	1968	
Pallad wz. 1983	Zakłady Mechaniczne Tarnów		40 mm grenade	Poland	1968	
Pindad SPG-1	Pindad		40 mm grenade	Indonesia	2005(?)	
QLG-10			35 mm grenade	China	2010s	
RGM-40	V.N. Teles		40 mm grenade	Russia	1997	Stand-alone version of the GP-30
RGS-50M	Degtyaryov Plant		50mm grenade	Soviet Union	1990s	
RWGŁ-3	Łucznik Arms Factory		UGŁ-200 canister	Poland	1970s	
Schiessbecher			30mm	Germany	1942	For the Karabiner 98k rifle
Shorty 40	LMT (Lewis Machine & Tool Company)		40 mm grenade	United States	2024	
SIG GL 5040	Swiss Arms		40 mm grenade	Switzerland	1997	Usable with the Sig 550 family
T85 grenade launcher	Combined Logistics Command		40 mm grenade	Taiwan (Republic of China)	1992	Usable on T65, T86 and T91 assault rifles
Type 2 rifle grenade launcher			40mm	Japan	1940s	For the Type 38 and Type 99 rifles
Type 91 grenade launcher	Norinco (China North Industries Corporation)		35 mm grenade (Non-lethal round)	China	1991	Usable on Type 56, Type 81 and QBZ-95 Chinese rifles
UBGL-1	Arsenal JSCo.		40 mm caseless grenade	Bulgaria		
VB rifle grenade	Viven-Bessières (VB)		—	France	1916	
Verrou Mortier 2.5 pouces	—		2.5 inches	France	16th century or 17th century	Brass grenade launcher with a trigger lock
VHS-BG grenade launcher	HS Produkt		40 mm grenade	Croatia	2007	Designed for the HS Produkt VHS rifle
XM148 grenade launcher	Colt's Manufacturing Company		40 mm grenade	United States	1964	

== Multiple-grenades launcher ==
=== Automatic ===
Name	Manufacturer	Image	Cartridge	Country	Year	Note
6S19	Pribor Research and Production Association		40 mm caseless grenade	Russia	2022	
AGS-17	Molot plant		30×29mm grenade	Soviet Union	1967	
AGS-30	Degtyarev plant		30×29mm grenade	Russia	1995	
AGS-40 Balkan	Tecmash Research and Production Association		40 mm caseless grenade	Russia	2017	
Daewoo Precision Industries K4	S&T Motiv		40 mm grenade	Republic of Korea	1985	
Howa Type 96	Howa		40 mm grenade	Japan	1996	
Heckler & Koch GMG	Heckler & Koch		40 mm grenade	Germany	1992	
Indumil IMC-40	INDUMIL		40 mm grenade	Colombia		
KBA-117	kbmia		40 mm grenade	Ukraine		
M75 grenade launcher	Springfield Armory		40 mm grenade	United States	1961	
M129 grenade launcher	Ford Aerospace		40 mm grenade	United States	1966	
Metal Storm 3GL	Metal Storm		40mm (electronically fired)	Australia	2007	
Mk 18 Mod 0 grenade launcher	Honeywell Corporation and Aeronautical Products Division		40 mm grenade	United States	1962	
Mk 19	Saco Defense Industries; Combined Service Forces		40 mm grenade	United States	1960s	
Mk 20	NOS Louisville		40 mm grenade	United States		
Mk 47 Striker	General Dynamics		40 mm grenade	United States	2000s	
PAK-40 AGL	Daudsons		40 mm grenade	Pakistan	2022	
QLZ-04 grenade launcher	Norinco		35 mm grenade	China	2000s	
QLZ-87 grenade launcher	Norinco		35×32mmSR	China	1980s	
QLU-11 / LG5	Norinco		35 mm grenade	China	2010s	
RDS40-AGL	Repkon Defence		40 mm grenade	Turkey	2022	
SB LAG 40	Santa Bárbara Sistemas		40 mm grenade	Spain	1984	
Squad Support Automatic Grenade Launcher(LG-02)	CJAIE (China Jing An Import & Export Corp.)		40 mm grenade	China		
STK 40 AGL SPG-3	ST Kinetics or Pindad under licence		40 mm grenade	Singapore Indonesia	1991	
Type 87 grenade launcher	Norinco		35 mm grenade	China	1980s	
UAG-40			40 mm grenade	Ukraine		
Vektor Y3 AGL	Denel		40 mm grenade	South Africa	1992	
XM174 grenade launcher	Aerojet Ordnance Manufacturing Company		40 mm grenade	United States	1968	
XM175 grenade launcher	Hughes Aircraft Company		40 mm grenade	United States	1968	
XM307 Advanced Crew Served Weapon	General Dynamics Armament; Technical Products		25 mm grenade	United States		

=== Semi-automatic ===
Name	Manufacturer	Image	Cartridge	Country	Year
DP-64	Degtyaryov Plant		45 mm	Russia	1989
MTL-30 "Multi-purpose Tactical Launcher"	FN Herstal		30 mm grenade	United States	2025
Hawk MM-1	Hawk Engineering Co.		40 mm grenade	United States	1970
Milkor MGL	Milkor (Pty) Ltd		40 mm grenade	South Africa	1980
Neopup PAW-20	Gemaco Elbree PTY LTD		20×42mm	South Africa	1999
PGS "Precision Grenadier System"	Northrop Grumman		25 mm grenade	United States	2025
RDS40-MGL	Repkon Defence		40 mm grenade	Turkey	2023
RG-6 grenade launcher	TsKIB SOO		40 mm grenade	Russia	1993
RGA-86	Military University of Technology		26.7 mm	Poland	1986
RGP-40	Zakłady Mechaniczne Tarnów		40 mm grenade	Poland	2017
SSRS "Squad Support Rifle System"	Barrett Firearms Manufacturing		30 mm grenade	United States	2024
SSW 40 "Squad Support Weapon 40"	Rheinmetall		40 mm grenade	Germany	2022
XRGL	Rippel Effect		40 mm grenade	South Africa	2007

=== Dual-use weapons ===
Name	Manufacturer	Image	Cartridge	Country	Year
QTS-11			20mm grenade	China	2011
S&T Daewoo K11	S&T Motiv		20×30mm grenade	Republic of Korea	2000
OICW-type 88-2					
Scicon IW	SD Scicon Ltd		10 mm grenade	United Kingdom	1984
XM25 CDTE	Heckler & Koch; Alliant Techsystems		25 mm grenade	United States	2010
XM29 OICW	Heckler & Koch; Alliant Techsystems		20 mm grenade	United States; Germany	1996

== Rocket propelled grenades ==
Name	Manufacturer	Image	Cartridge	Country	Year	Variants
Bazooka				United States	1942	
Carl Gustav recoilless rifle	Saab Bofors Dynamics		84×246mmR	Sweden	1946	
MRO-A	State Research; Bazalt		72.5mm warhead	Russia	2003	
Navy 8 cm Rocket Launcher / 八糎噴進砲			80mm	Empire of Japan	1944	
Northover Projector			63.5mm warhead	United Kingdom	1940	
Panzerfaust			149mm warhead	Germany	1942	
PIAT	Imperial Chemical Industries			United Kingdom	1942	
Rifleman's Assault Weapon	Brunswick Corporation		100mm warhead	United States	1977	
RPG-2	State Factories		80mm warhead	Soviet Union	1949	
RPG-7	Bazalt; Degtyarev plant		40mm warhead	Soviet Union	1961	Type 69 RPG, Chinese variant; Yasin (RPG), used by Hamas
RPG-16			58.3mm warhead	Soviet Union	1968	
RPG-18			64mm warhead	Soviet Union	1972	
RPG-22			72.5mm warhead	Soviet Union	1985	
RPG-26	State Research; Bazalt		72.5mm warhead	Soviet Union	1980s	
RPG-27	State Research; Bazalt		105mm warhead	Soviet Union	1980s	
RPG-28	State Research; Bazalt		125mm warhead	Russia	2000s	
RPG-29	Bazalt		65mm warhead 105mm warhead	Soviet Union	1980s	
RPG-30	State Research; Bazalt		105mm warhead	Russia	2008	
RPG-32	JARDANA		72mm warhead 105mm warhead	Russia	2005	
RPG-76 Komar	Zakład Sprzętu Precyzyjnego		40mm warhead	Polish People's Republic	1985	
RPO-A Shmel	KBP Instrument Design Bureau		93mm warhead	Soviet Union	1980s	
Sturmpistole	Walther		26-61mm warheads	Germany	1942	
Type 4			72x359mm	Empire of Japan	1944	
Type 5 45mm recoilless rifle			45mm (80mm warhead)	Empire of Japan	1944	

== See also ==
- List of weapons
- List of firearms
- List of machine guns
- List of multiple-barrel firearms
- List of pistols
- List of revolvers
- List of sniper rifles
- List of flamethrowers
