= AGS-40 Balkan =

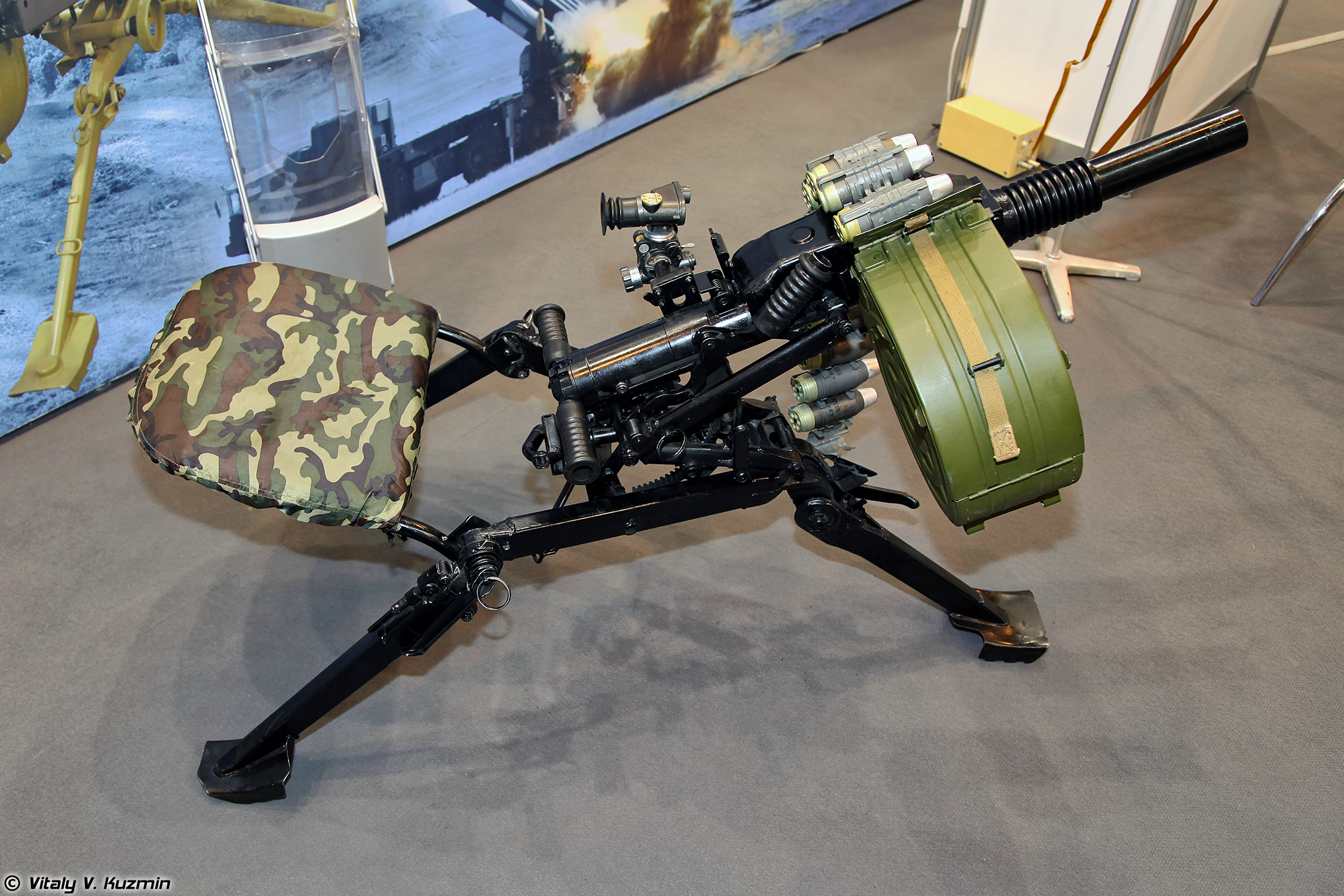
- AGS-40 Balkan
- Type: Automatic grenade launcher
- Place of origin: Russia

Service history
- In service: 2017–present
- Used by: See Users

Production history
- Designer: TsKIB SOO; GNPP "Pribor"
- Designed: 1980–2017
- Manufacturer: Tecmash Research and Production Association
- Produced: 2017–present

Specifications
- Mass: 32 kilograms (71 lb) unloaded on tripod 46 kilograms (101 lb) on tripod loaded with drum of 20 rounds
- Cartridge: Caseless 40 mm grenade
- Action: Gas Piston, Open Bolt
- Rate of fire: 400 rpm
- Maximum firing range: 2,500 m (2,700 yd)
- Feed system: 20 grenade disintegrating belt in drum
- Sights: PAG-17, iron sights

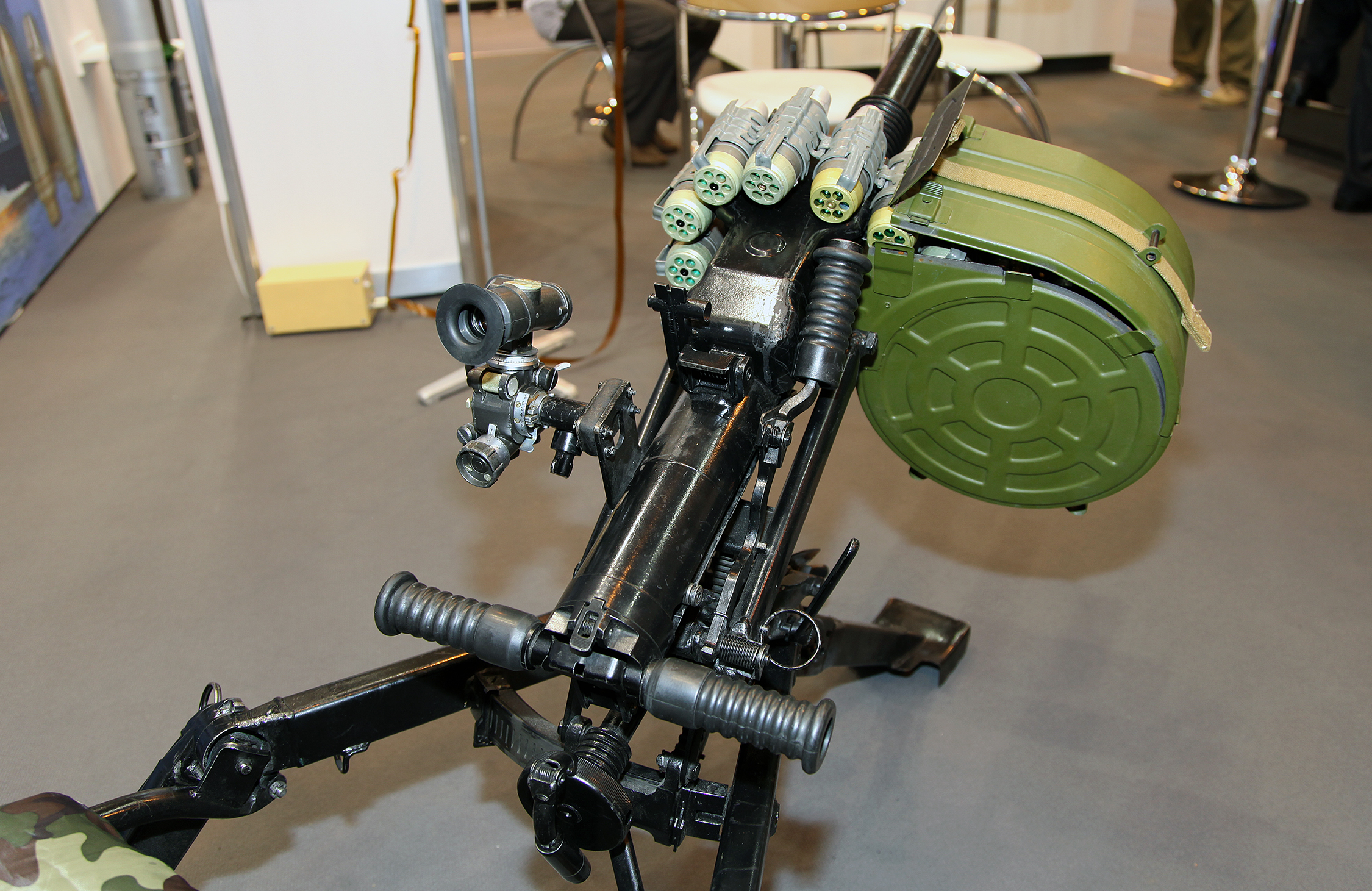
Close-up view of Russian AGS-40 grenade launcher

AGS‑40 Balkan is a Russian 40 mm caseless automatic grenade launcher and successor to AGS-17 and AGS-30, introduced and adopted by the Russian military.

== Design ==
The AGS-40 uses 40 mm CL (caseless) grenades with a range of 2,500 m (compared to the 30 mm grenades with range 1,700 for AGS-17 and 2,100 for AGS-30) and a rate of fire of 400 rounds per minute, with short burst (5 rounds), long burst (10 rounds), and continuous fire modes. The weapon is usually equipped with a tripod and a PAG-17 2.7× telescopic sight; it can also have back-up iron sights installed.

A unique feature of the AGS-40 is a detachable seat that allows for more stable shooting using the weight of an operator.

=== Ammunition ===
- Caseless high-explosive-fragmentation 40 mm 7P39 grenades.
- 7P39P and 7P39U practice rounds

== Development ==
Development of the AGS-40 started in 1980 but stalled after the dissolution of the Soviet Union and the subsequent economic decline in Russia. However, the project was revived in the early 1990s under the codename "Balkan", and was put into operational evaluation in 2018. State tests were successfully completed and the weapon was recommended for introduction into service as of March 2021. The first serial batch was delivered in January 2022. AGS-40 can be installed on armored vehicles. The AGS-40 can be integrated with Kalashnikov MBDU remote weapon station.

== Users ==
- Russian Federation

== See also ==
- Comparison of automatic grenade launchers
- GP-25 – (Soviet Union)
- AGS-30 – (Russia)
- AGS-17 – (Soviet Union)
- Mk 19 grenade launcher – (United States)
- Daewoo Precision Industries K4 – (South Korea)
- Mk 47 Striker – (United States)
- Type 87 grenade launcher – (China)
- Type 04 grenade launcher – (China)
- Howa Type 96 – (Japan)
- Vektor Y3 AGL – (South Africa)
- SB LAG 40 – (Spain)
- HK GMG – (Germany)
- XM174 grenade launcher – (United States)
- Milkor MGL – (South Africa)
- RGS-50M – (Russia, Soviet Union)
- RGSh-30 – (Ukraine)
- RPO Rys – (Soviet Union)
- MRG-1 – (Soviet Union)
