= MK285 =

Norwegian 40 mm airburst grenade

The Mk 285 is an airburst grenade that can be fired from certain 40 mm belt-fed automatic grenade launchers.

The grenade was designed for the Mk 47 Striker. The Mk 47 is a candidate for replacing the Mk 19 grenade launcher, first fielded in 1968, and still in widespread service, around the world. The Mk 47 is considerably lighter than the Mk 19, is designed to fire all the same suites of grenades as the Mk 19, together with more modern grenades the Mk 19 could not fire with full functionality, like the Mk 285 grenade.

The Mk 285 contains a programmable fuse, initially designed by Bofors but finalized by Nammo, that sets the distance at which the grenade will explode, when the weapon's trigger is pulled. The weapon's computerized sight will have measured the distance to the target the gunner was aiming at, and that distance will be transferred to the grenade's fuse. The munition spins, on its way to the target, and the fuse counts rotations to measure the distance travelled.

This airburst capability means that the grenade can damage or disable soft targets, like trucks, with a near miss. It also means the grenade can injure or kill soldiers who are behind walls or in trenches, through indirect fire, who could not be hurt by more conventional grenades that exploded when hitting those walls. The manufacturer characterizes the grenade as a weapon that can hit around corners.

As of 2015 the Mk 19 remained the frontline grenade launcher used by the US military. Limited numbers of Mk 47 weapons had been issued to special forces units.

The grenade is manufactured by the Norwegian firm Nammo Raufoss.

The explosive in the grenade is classed as "insensitive" - ie. less likely to sympathetically explode due to the nearby explosion of other munitions.
