= SB LAG 40 =

SB-40 LAG
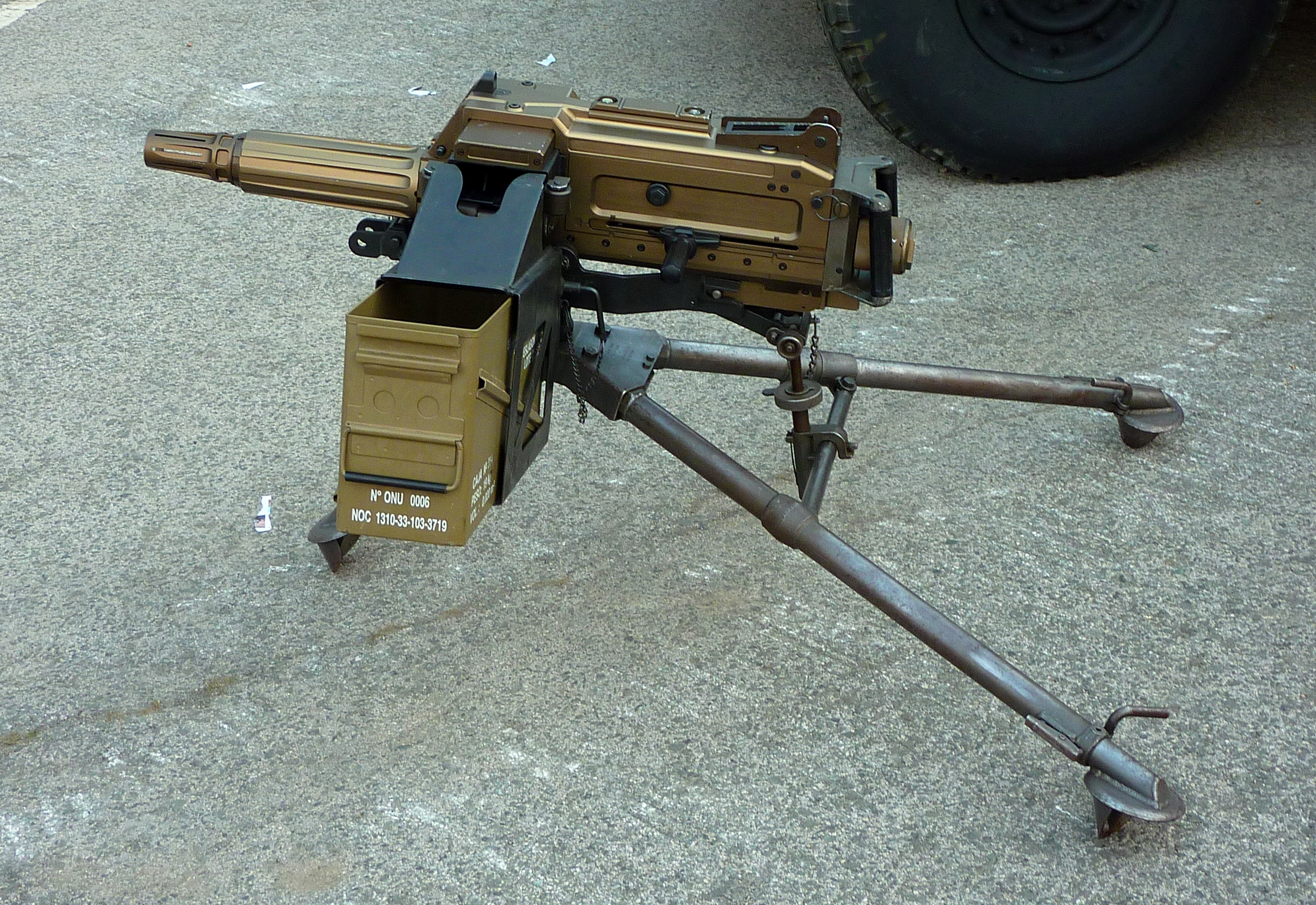
- A LAG 40 of the Spanish Navy Marines.
- Type: Automatic grenade launcher
- Place of origin: Spain

Production history
- Designer: Empresa Nacional Santa Bárbara
- Designed: 1984
- Manufacturer: Santa Bárbara Sistemas

Specifications
- Mass: 34 kg (75.0 lb)
- Length: 960 mm (37.8 in)
- Barrel length: 415 mm (16.3 in)
- Width: 200 mm (7.9 in)
- Height: 220 mm (8.7 in)
- Cartridge: 40x53mmSR
- Caliber: 40mm
- Action: Recoil operated, roller locked
- Rate of fire: 215 rounds/min
- Muzzle velocity: 240 m/s (787 ft/s)
- Effective firing range: Sights adjustable from 100 to 1500 m
- Feed system: 24 or 32-round ammunition belt
- Sights: Leaf sight

The SB-40 LAG is a 40 mm automatic grenade launcher developed and produced in Spain by the Empresa Nacional Santa Bárbara (EN SB) company (currently a part of the European Land Systems Group of General Dynamics).

== Users ==
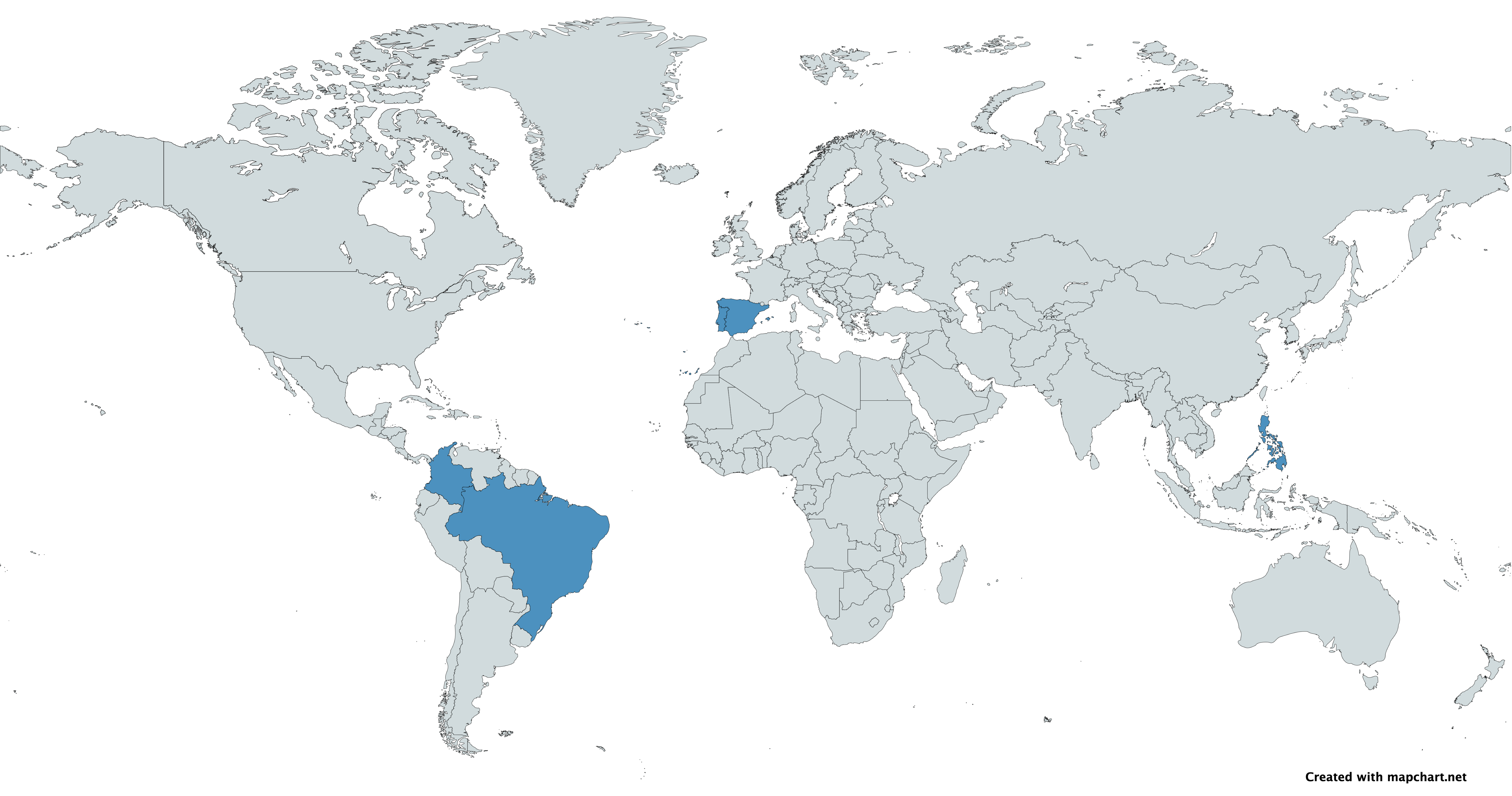
Map with SB-40 LAG users in blue

- Brazil: Used by Brazilian Marine Corps (Mounted on Piranha IIIC).
- Colombia: The Colombian Navy uses the SB-40 LAG grenade launcher installed on a turret on the ARC Juan Ricardo Oyola Vera riverine patrol boat.
- Philippines: Used by the Philippine National Police Special Action Force either on tripod or mounted on light utility vehicles, and by Philippine National Police Maritime Group mounted on patrol crafts
- Portugal: used on M-11D scout cars (Panhard VBLs)
- Spain: used by the Spanish Army (Ejército de Tierra de España), Spanish Navy Marines and Guardia Civil Española.

== See also ==
- Denel Y3 AGL - automatic grenade launcher used by South Africa.
- Heckler & Koch GMG - A 40 mm automatic grenade launcher used by the German Army and other European armed forces.
- XM174 grenade launcher, similar weapon
- AGS-17, similar weapon, but smaller 30 mm calibre
- Milkor MGL, another South African 40 mm grenade launcher
- Mk 19 grenade launcher, similar weapon
- XM307 (ACSW) (crew-served 25 mm autocannon)
- XM25 CDTE (25 mm airburst personal weapon)
- Comparison of automatic grenade launchers
