= AGS-30 =

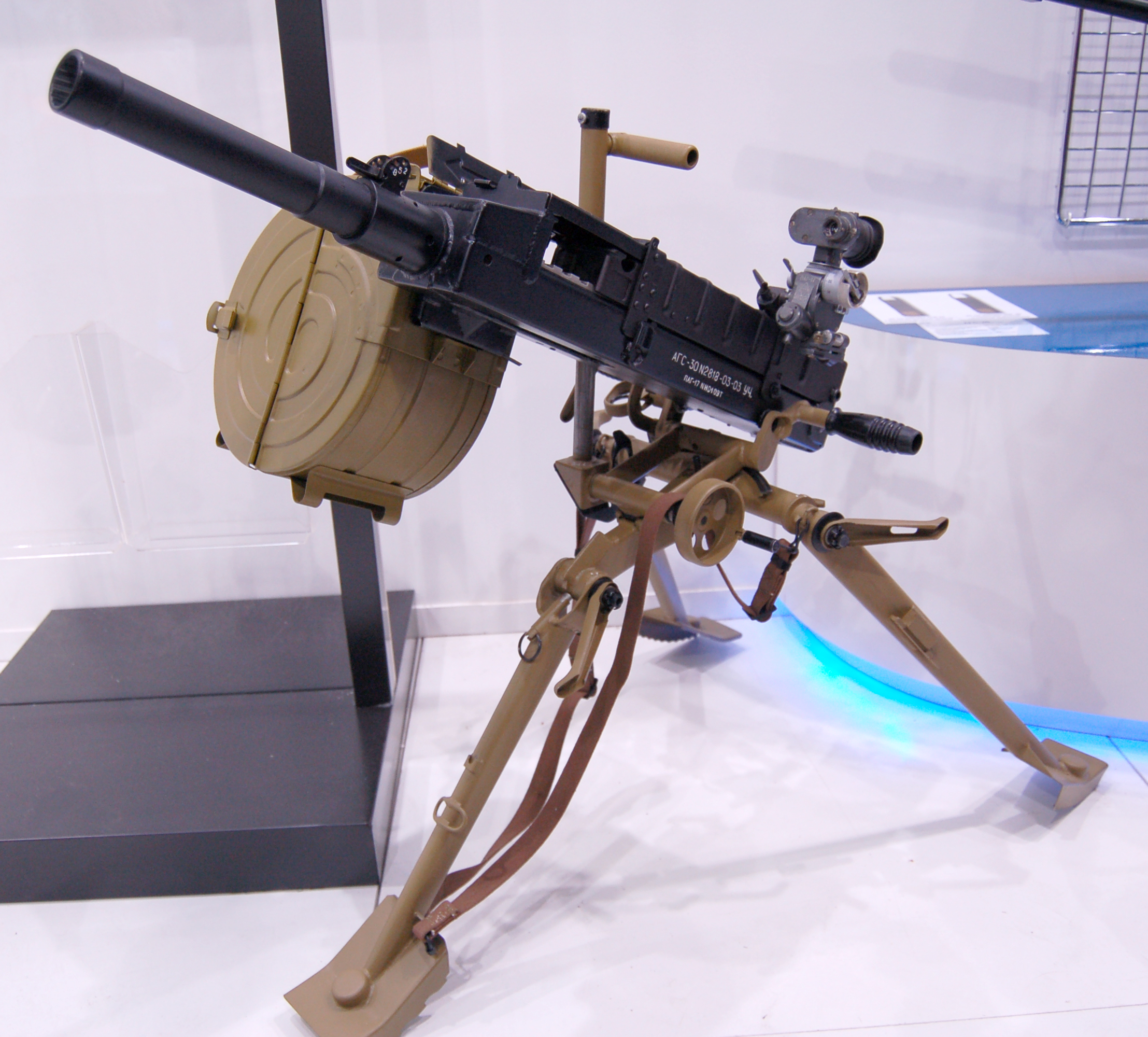
- AGS-30 at MAKS 2009
- Type: Automatic grenade launcher
- Place of origin: Russia

Service history
- In service: 1995–present
- Used by: See Users
- Wars: Second Chechen War; 2008 South Ossetia war Syrian Civil War; Russo-Ukrainian War; Yemeni Civil War (2015–present); Saudi Arabian-led intervention in Yemen; 2020 Nagorno-Karabakh conflict

Production history
- Designer: KBP Instrument Design Bureau
- Designed: 1990
- Manufacturer: ZID
- Produced: since 1995
- Variants: AG-30M vehicle-mounted version

Specifications
- Mass: 16 kg unloaded
- Length: 1,165 mm
- Cartridge: 30×29mm grenade
- Caliber: 30 mm
- Action: Blowback
- Rate of fire: 400 round/min
- Muzzle velocity: 185 m/s
- Effective firing range: 2,100 m (with GPD-30 round)
- Feed system: 29 grenade belt
- Sights: Adjustable telescopic sight, day-night sight, mechanical sight, portable radar

The AGS-30 is a Russian automatic grenade launcher currently in production in Russia and in service with the Russian armed forces.

== Description ==
Designed on the basis of AGS-17, the AGS-30 provides better mobility, longer range and better accuracy during firing. Significantly lighter than its previous version, the AGS-30 weighs 30 kg loaded, meaning it can be carried by one person. Using a specially designed GPD-30 grenade, the AGS-30 can engage targets at 2100m. Recoil is lessened with a smoother grenade ejection mechanism. An adjustable SAG-30 tripod mount (GRAU index 6P17) is also included.

== Development ==
After the success of the AGS-17 in Afghanistan, the KBP Instrument Design Bureau began work on a new grenade launcher. The Russian army needed a weapon that could easily flush militants out of their fortified building hideouts. The new design proved to be effective, and it was officially adopted in 2002, and was later adopted by the Russian Interior Ministry Troops.

== Ammunition ==
The AGS-30 is fed from special belt drums that hold 29 linked rounds. The Loaded belt drum weighs about 14 kg. Spade grips are installed on a gun cradle integral to the tripod, instead of to the gun body. The AGS-30 can only fire in fully automatic. Standard sighting equipment is a 2.7X magnification PAG-17 optical sight.

AGS-30 uses standard VOG-17M, enhanced fragmentation VOG-30, VOG-30D and extended range GPD-30 grenades.

- VOG-17M (HE)
- IO-30 (HE)
- IO-30TP (Practice)
- VOG-30 (HE)
- VOG-30D (HE)
- VUS-30 (Smoke)
- GPD-30 (HE)

== Variants ==
- AG-30M – Vehicle mounted version with electric trigger mechanism.

== Users ==
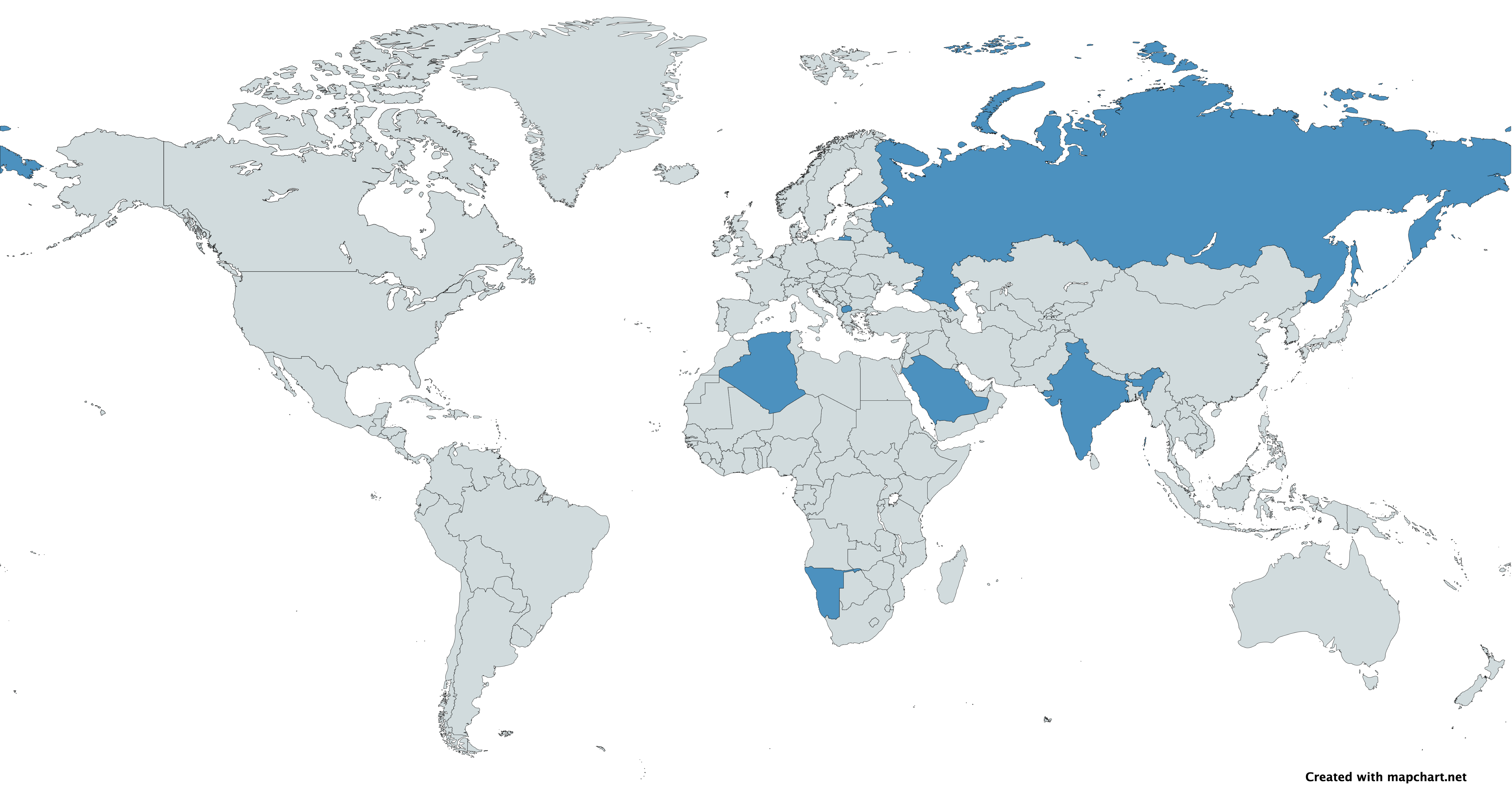
Map with AGS-30 Atlant users in blue

- Algeria
- India
- Namibia
- North Macedonia
- Russia
- Saudi Arabia
- Vietnam - SPL-30 unlicensed copy.

== See also ==
- AGS-40 Balkan – (Russia)
- Daewoo Precision Industries K4 – (South Korea)
- Howa Type 96 – (Japan)
- Mk 19 grenade launcher – (United States)
- Mk 47 Striker – (United States)
- QLZ-87 grenade launcher – (China)
- List of Russian weaponry
- Comparison of automatic grenade launchers
