= AGS-17 =

AGS-17 Plamya
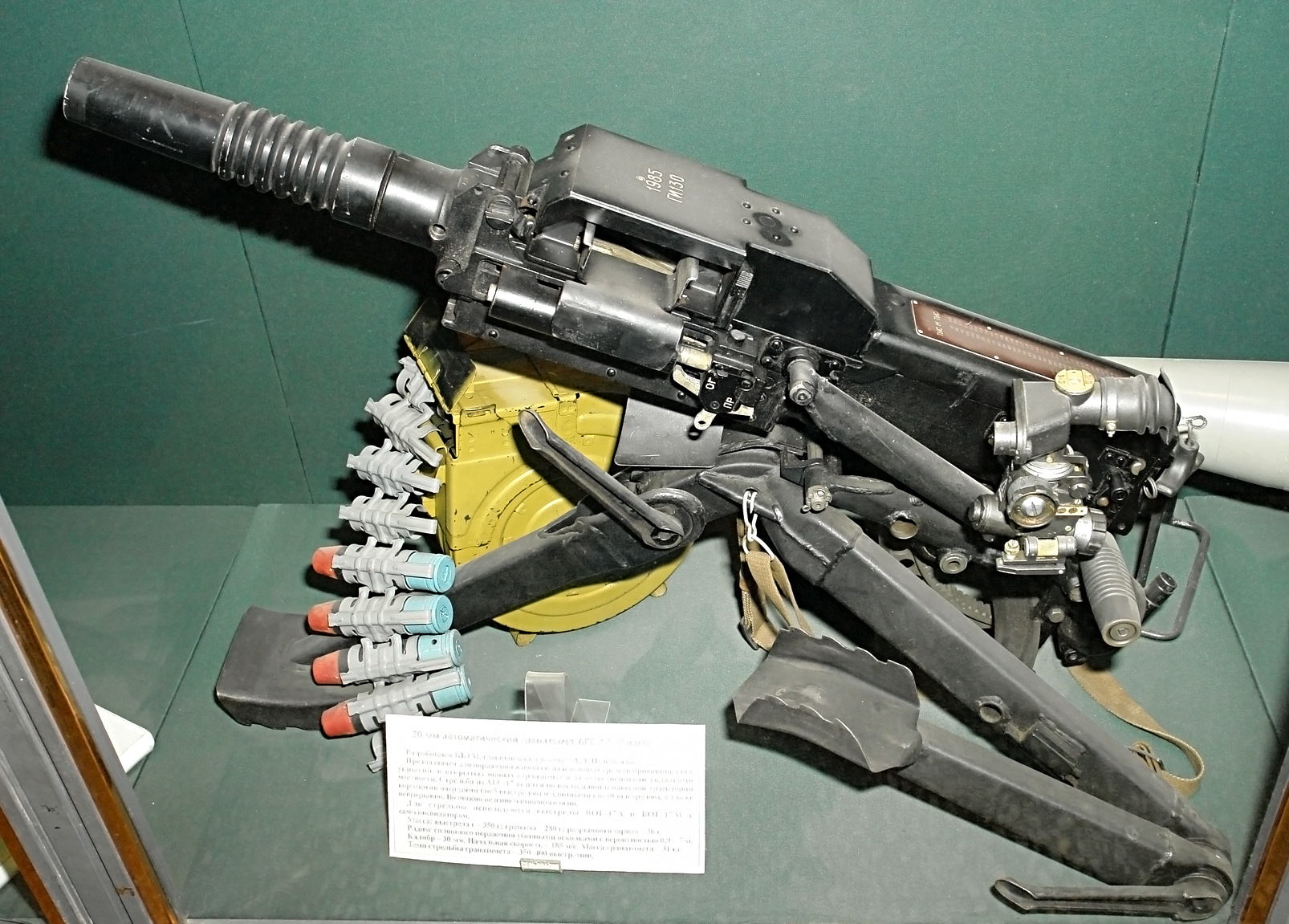
- AGS-17 mounted on tripod.
- Type: Automatic grenade launcher
- Place of origin: Soviet Union

Service history
- In service: 1970–present
- Used by: See Users
- Wars: Soviet–Afghan War; South African Border War; Gulf War; Somali Civil War; First Chechen War; Cenepa War; Second Chechen War; War in Afghanistan; Iraq War; Ivorian Civil Wars; Sudanese conflict in South Kordofan and Blue Nile; Syrian Civil War; War in Iraq (2013–2017); Russo-Ukrainian War; Yemeni Civil War (2014–present); Second Nagorno-Karabakh War; Russo-Ukrainian war (2022–present)

Production history
- Designer: KB Tochmash
- Designed: 1967
- Manufacturer: Molot Plant
- Produced: 1967
- Variants: AG-17A helicopter-mounted version

Specifications
- Mass: 31 kg
- Length: 840 mm
- Cartridge: 30×29mm grenade
- Caliber: 30 mm
- Action: Blowback
- Rate of fire: 400 round/min
- Muzzle velocity: 185 m/s
- Effective firing range: 800 to 1,700 m
- Feed system: 29 grenades belt
- Sights: Adjustable iron sights, optional mount required for optical sights

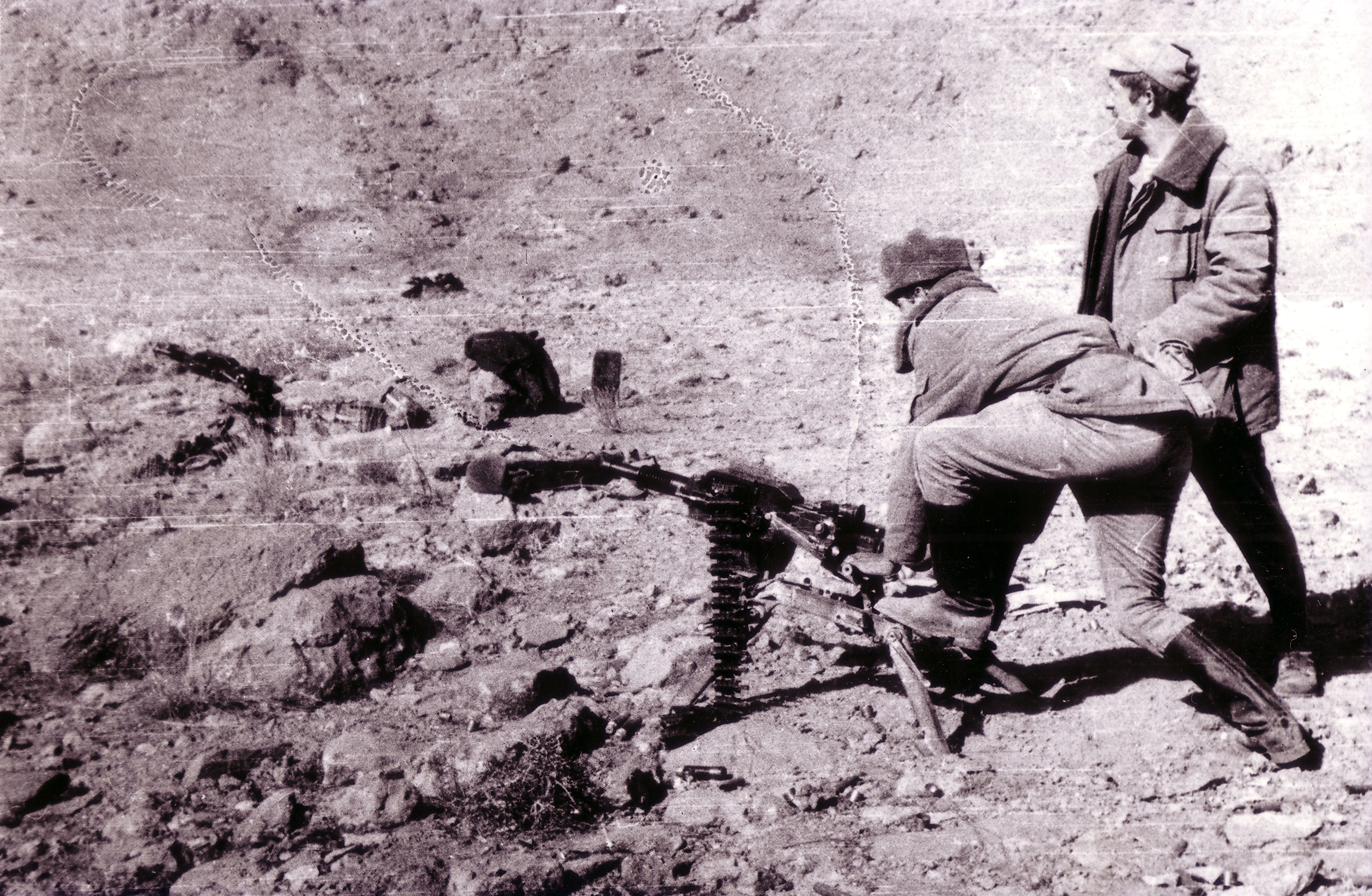
AGS-17 in Afghanistan. 1986

The AGS-17 Plamya (Russian: АГС-17 «Пламя», lit. 'Flame') is a Soviet-designed automatic grenade launcher in service worldwide.

== Description ==
The AGS-17 is a heavy infantry support weapon designed to operate from a tripod or mounted on an installation or vehicle. The AGS-17 fires 30 mm grenades in either direct or indirect fire to provide suppressive and lethal fire support against soft-skinned or fortified targets.

The weapon uses a blowback mechanism to sustain operation. Rounds are fired through a removable (to reduce barrel stress) rifled barrel.

The standard metal ammunition drum contains 29 linked rounds.

The tripod is equipped with fine levelling gear for indirect fire trajectories.

== Development ==
Development of the AGS-17 (Avtomaticheskiy Granatomyot Stankovyi—Automatic Grenade launcher, Mounted) started in the USSR in 1965 by the OKB-16 design bureau (now known as the KB Tochmash), under the leadership of Alexander F. Kornyakov.

This lightweight weapon was to provide infantry with close to medium range fire support against enemy personnel and unarmored targets, like trucks, half-tracks, jeeps and sandbag-protected machine-gun nests. The first prototypes of the new weapon entered trials in 1969, with mass production commencing in 1971. The AGS-17 was widely operated and well-liked by Soviet troops in Afghanistan as a ground support weapon or as a vehicle weapon on improvised mounts installed on armoured personnel carriers and trucks.

A special airborne version of the AGS-17, the AG-17A, was developed for installation on helicopters, including the Mi-24 Hind in gun pods and the Mil Mi-8 on door mounts. This weapon had a thick aluminium jacket on the barrel and used a special mount and an electric remotely controlled trigger.

It is still in use with the Russian army as a direct fire support weapon for infantry troops; it is also installed in several vehicle mounts and turrets along with machine guns, guided rocket launchers and sighting equipment. It is being replaced by the AGS-30 launcher, which fires the same ammunition, but weighs only 16 kg unloaded on the tripod and has an upgraded blowback action.

== Variants ==
- AG-17A - remotely controlled aircraft-mounted version with an electric trigger mechanism.
- AGS-17D - remotely controlled vehicle-mounted version with an electric trigger mechanism.

== Ammunition ==
The AGS-17 fires 30×29 mm belted cartridges with a steel cartridge case. Two types of ammunition are commonly fired from the AGS-17. The VOG-17M is the version of the original 30 mm grenade ammunition, which is currently available and has a basic high explosive fragmentation warhead. The VOG-30 is similar, but contains a better explosive filling and an enhanced fragmentation design that greatly increases the effective blast radius. New improved VOG-30D grenade was taken into service in 2013 for use with AGS-17 and AGS-30 grenade launchers. It was ordered by the Russian Defense Ministry in August 2023. The same month, the Russian troops fighting in Ukraine begun to receive VOG-17 grenades, factory modified for use by commercial drones.

The Bulgarian weapons manufacturer Arcus produces AR-ROG hand grenades based on VOG-17 cartridges and UZRGM (Russian: УЗРГМ), which is also a Soviet design of fuse. Similar improvised grenades are known as "khattabkas".

- VOG-17M (HE)
- IO-30 (HE)
- IO-30TP (Practice)
- VOG-30 (HE)
- VOG-30D (HE)
- VUS-30 (Smoke)

== Users ==
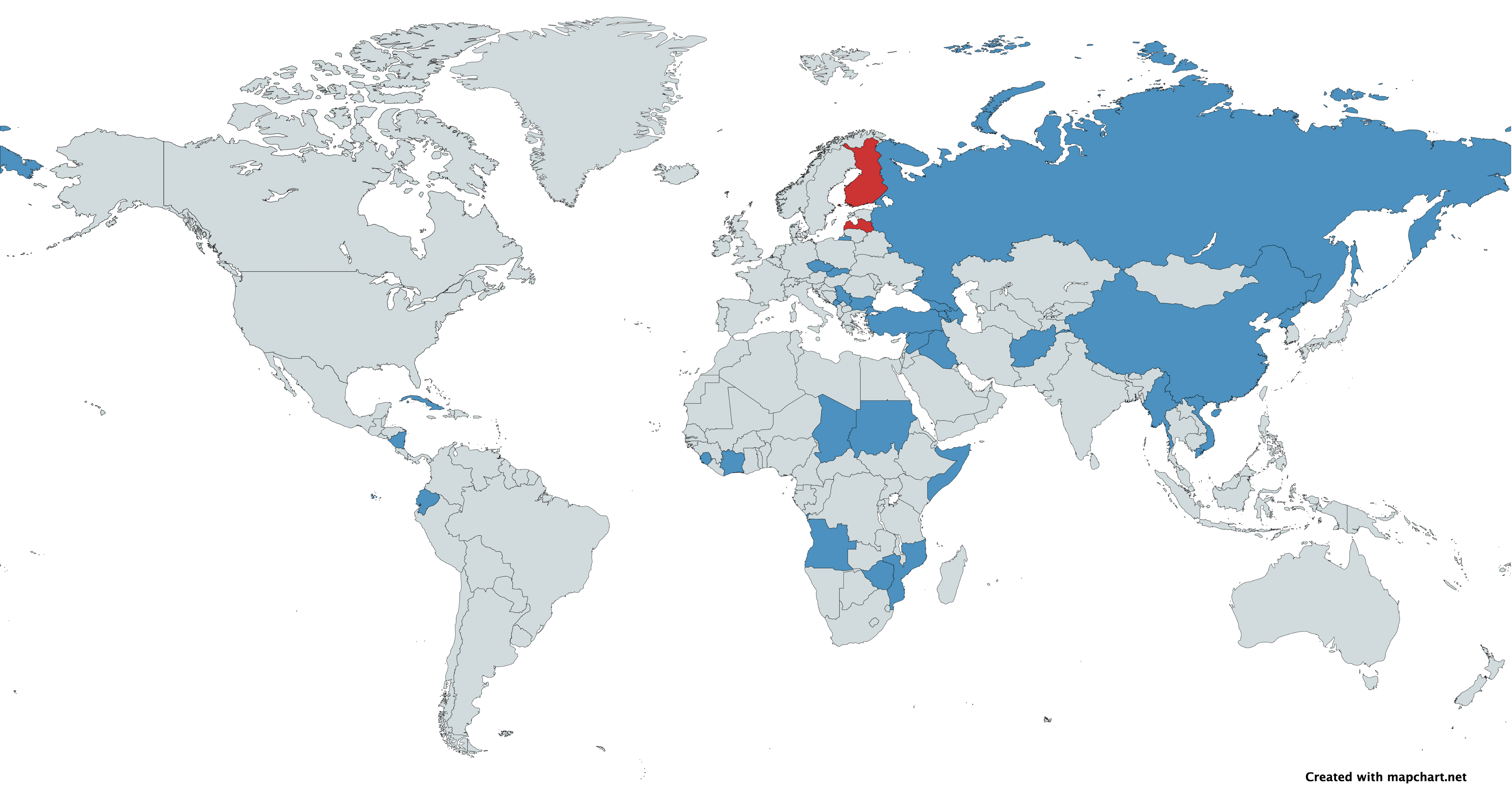
Map with AGS-17 Plamya users in blue and former users in red

=== Current ===
- Afghanistan
- Angola
- Armenia: Imported
- Azerbaijan
- Bulgaria: A modernized version, the AGL-30M, produced locally by Arsenal AD with documentation from DSO Metalhim.
- Chad
- China: Produced by Norinco based on captured examples from Mujahideen groups.
- Cuba
- Czech Republic
- Ecuador: Used during Cenepa War 1995.
- Georgia
- Iraq: Produced under license.
- Islamic State
- Ivory Coast
- Montenegro: Designated the M93.
- Mozambique
- Myanmar
- Nicaragua
- North Korea
- Russia
- Serbia: Designated the M93 Produced under license.
- Sierra Leone
- Slovakia
- Somalia
- Sudan: Used by the Sudanese Armed Forces, some captured by the Sudan People's Liberation Movement-North
- Syria
- Turkey
- Vietnam: Made under license in Z125 Factory. Known under the Vietnamese industrial name of SPL-17.

=== Former ===
- Afghanistan
- Czechoslovakia
- India
- Finland: designated 30 KrKK AGS-17, replaced by the HK GMG in 2005.
- Latvia: Used in the 1990s, now replaced by the HK GMG.
- Soviet Union: Passed on to successor states.

== See also ==
- AGS-30, first successor
- AGS‑40 Balkan, second successor using caseless high-explosive 40mm 7P39 grenades.
- Daewoo Precision Industries K4, South Korean 40 mm grenade launcher
- GA-40 similar weapon (in Polish)
- HK GMG, similar weapon
- Howa Type 96, similar weapon
- Milkor MGL, another South African 40 mm grenade launcher
- Mk 19 grenade launcher, similar weapon
- SB LAG 40
- Type 87 grenade launcher, used by the People's Liberation Army
- Vektor Y3 AGL
- XM174 grenade launcher, similar weapon
