= Daewoo Precision Industries K4 =

Daewoo Precision Industries K4 K4 고속유탄기관총
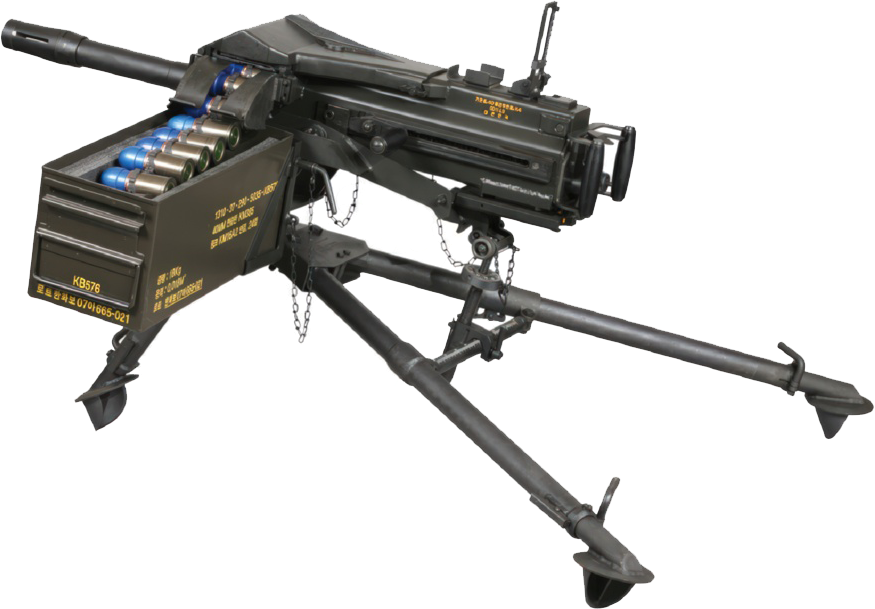
- K4 automatic grenade launcher
- Type: Automatic grenade launcher
- Place of origin: South Korea

Service history
- In service: 1993–present
- Used by: See Users
- Wars: War in Afghanistan; Iraq War; Libyan Civil War

Production history
- Designer: Agency for Defense Development; Daewoo Precision Industries
- Designed: 1985–1991
- Manufacturer: Daewoo Precision Industries (1981–1999); Daewoo Telecom (1999–2002); Daewoo Precision (2002–2006); S&T Daewoo (2006–2012); S&T Motiv (2012–2021); SNT Motiv (2021–present)
- Produced: 1993–present

Specifications
- Mass: 34.4 kg (75.84 lb) (no tripod)
- Length: 1,072 mm (42.2 in)
- Barrel length: 412 mm (16.22 in)
- Cartridge: 40×53mm grenade
- Caliber: 40 mm
- Action: API blowback
- Rate of fire: 325–378 rounds/min
- Muzzle velocity: 240.8 m/s (790 ft/s) (K212); 242.3 m/s (795 ft/s) (KM383)
- Effective firing range: 1,500 m (1,600 yd)
- Maximum firing range: 2,200 m (2,400 yd)
- Feed system: belt-fed, 32 or 48 grenades belt
- Sights: KAN/TVS-5 night vision scope can be attached

The Daewoo Precision Industries K4 (Korean: K4 고속유탄기관총; Hanja: K4 高速榴彈機關槍) is a 40×53mm high-speed automatic grenade launcher in use with the Republic of Korea Armed Forces.

The K4 was developed as a complement to the K-201 hand-held grenade launcher (attachable to the K2).

== History ==
The K4 was first developed in 1994.

== Design ==
Demonstration of firing of the K4 automatic grenade launcher

It has a weight of 34.4 kg (empty, without accessories) and can fire up to 325 rounds per minute with a firing range of 1.5 km. When needed to be used during night operations, a KAN/TVS-5 night vision scope can be attached onto the receiver.

The K4 is said to visually resemble the Mk 19 AGL.

== Users ==
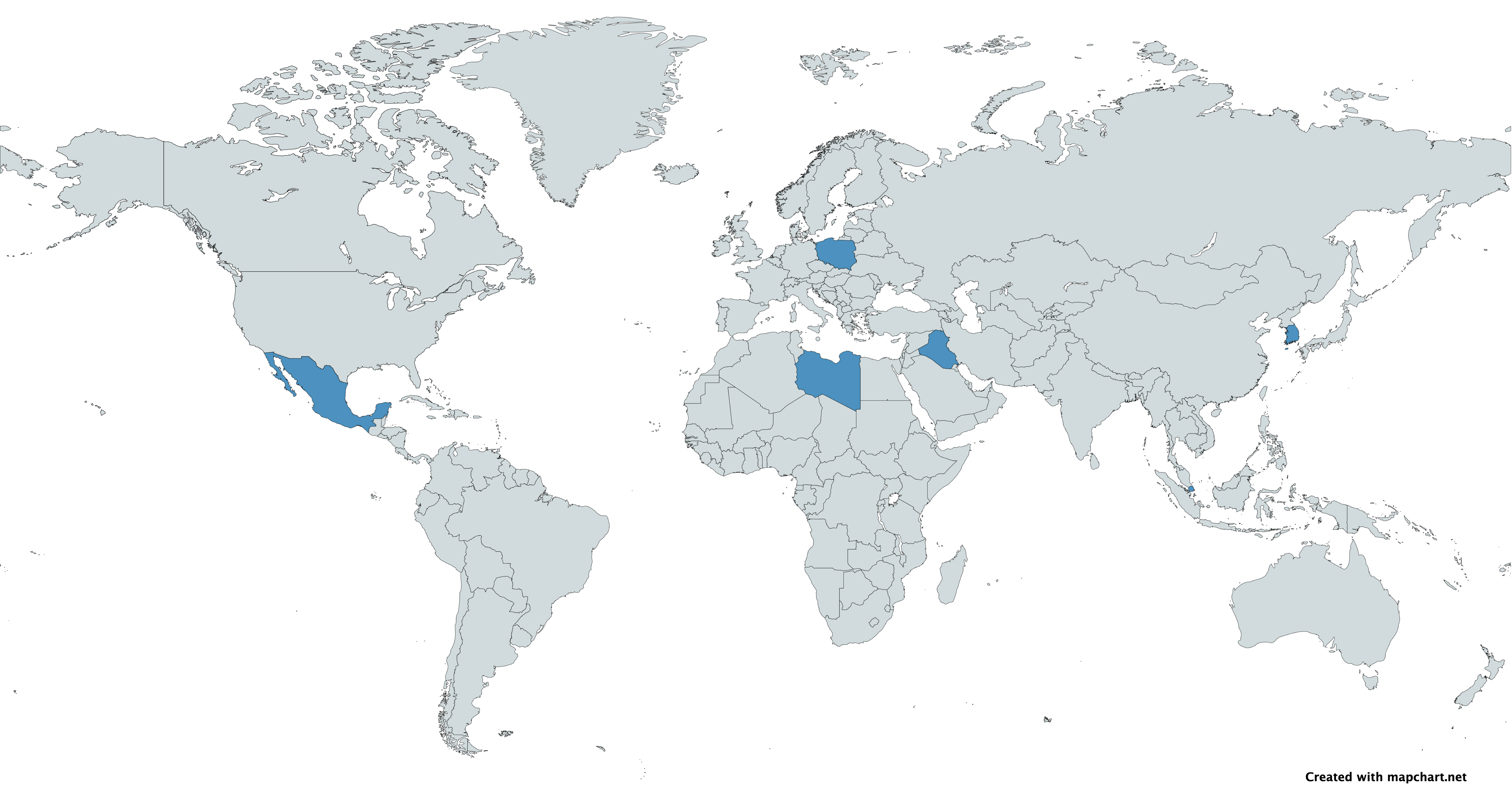
Map with K4 users in blue

- Iraq: Small numbers used by Iraqi special forces on Humvees.
- Libya: First export customer, purchased the K4 in 2009.
- Mexico: Purchased since 2011.
- Poland: Several hundred K4s ordered in 2022.
- South Korea
- Singapore: 17 K4s transferred according to a 2019 SIPRI small arms report.

== See also ==
- AGS-17 – (Soviet Union)
- AGS-30 – (Russia)
- AGS-40 – (Russia)
- GMW – (Germany)
- Mk 19 – (United States)
- Mk 47 – (United States)
- List of API blowback firearms
- List of grenade launchers
