= Denel Y3 AGL =

Denel 40mm Y3 Automatic Grenade Launcher
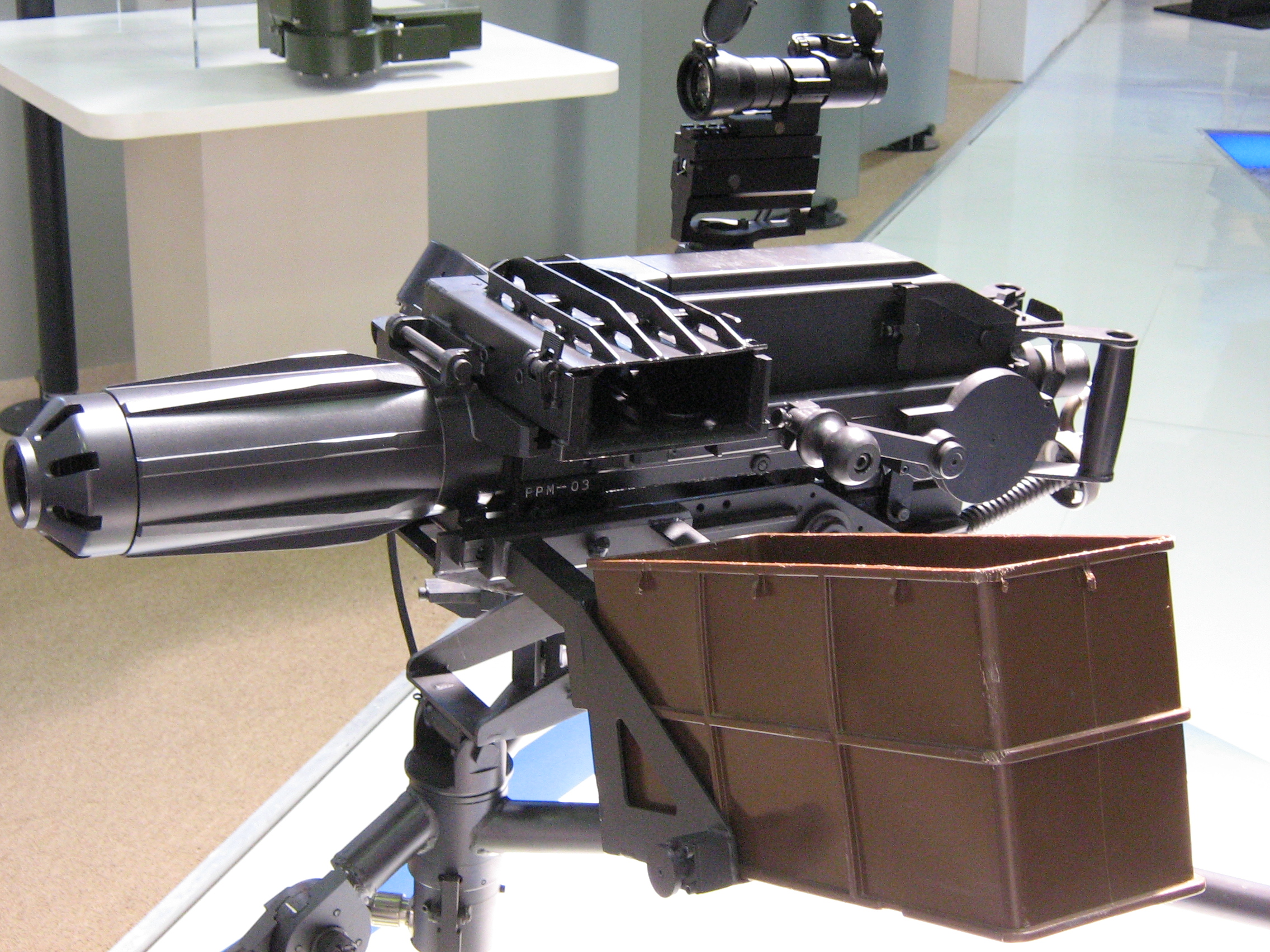
- Denel Y3 AGL [Model № FPM-03] showing optical sight and twenty-round ammunition feeding box.
- Type: High-velocity Automatic grenade launcher
- Place of origin: South Africa

Service history
- Used by: South African National Defence Force

Production history
- Designer: Aram (Pty.) Ltd. of Pretoria
- Designed: 1992
- Manufacturer: Denel Land Systems
- Produced: 2003 [Model № FPM-03]

Specifications
- Mass: 18 kg (40 lb) (weapon only), 32 kg (70.5 lb) (with tripod)
- Length: 844 mm (33.2 in)
- Barrel length: 300 mm (11.8 in)
- Width: 281 mm (11.1 in)
- Height: 267 mm (10.5 in)
- Crew: 3
- Cartridge: 40×53 mm grenade
- Caliber: 40mm
- Action: Long recoil; open breech
- Rate of fire: Maximum cyclic: 425rds/min (~7 rounds/second) [can be reduced to 360rds/min]
- Muzzle velocity: 242 m/s (794 ft/s)
- Maximum firing range: 2,176 metres (1.4 mi)
- Feed system: R/L Line-fed M16A2 linked 20 round belt, box cased ammunition [with a 55.5mm pitch]
- Sights: Optical or electronic [on-board ballistic computer, or 'LobSight']

The Denel Y3 AGL is a South African-manufactured automatic grenade launcher currently manufactured by Denel Land Systems. Originally developed by Aram Ltd as the AS88 as a support weapon for infantry, the patent rights were purchased and modified by Vektor, which later became a division of Denel Ltd. Further enhancements included rate of fire upgrade and the addition of a ballistics computer, with final qualification testing taking place in 1998, and operational testing in 2002. The Y3 was launched during the 2003 United Kingdom Defence Systems & Equipment (DSEi) International Exhibition.

== Design details ==
=== Operating mechanism and features ===
The launcher fires 40x53mm high velocity, medium trajectory calibre grenades at a rate of 360 to 425 rounds per minute. Operating via the long-recoil principle, the Y3 fires from an open breech (minimising the opportunity for grenade cook-off within the magazine) when in counter-recoil. Whilst all moving assemblies are buffered to reduce recoil and vibration, the unit lacks a conventional feed-lever mechanism. The feed direction and ammunition box mountings may be changed in-field without additional components, and are also able to be dual-loaded: enabling selection of two different types of 40mm rounds on the fly.

It can be mounted on vehicles or used with a ground-mount tripod. Manned by a team of three, the AGL is normally fired using a manual trigger; on a vehicle, this can be replaced with a firing solenoid. Due to its low recoil force and lightweight breech block, can be used on light-weight aircraft.

=== Functional description ===
The belt-linked grenades are fed from the magazine into position above the barrel. There the grenade is extracted from the belt and pushed downwards, to align with the barrel. Empty cartridge cases are ejected through an opening at the bottom of the AGL

=== Electronic sight ===
Due to the parabolic trajectory path of the 40mm grenades used, it is possible to use the Y3 against a target that is out of the user's direct sight (such as over cover or obstacles, or around corners; up to an elevation of 60 degrees). This indirect fire mode is, however, only realistically feasible during combat situations if the coordinates of its target are already known (for instance, calculated from a forward observation post); as otherwise the unit acts as a mortar (albeit with a relatively smaller lethal radius). The linked electronic ballistic computer [known as the 'LobSight'] can also be used to reinforce this 'electronic' sight line. By calculating the position, direction, and the angle required for the AGL to hit a given target, the LobSight greatly assists aim modification: providing optimum grenade impact and ammunition usage. If this data is unknown, the AGL may still be used to lay down suppressive fire against possible enemy locations but, again, at a reduced accuracy unless a laser sight or aiming scope is added.

=== Ammunition ===
The 40mm Y3 AGL can fire a wide range of "high velocity" 40×53mm 40mm grenades linked in belts of 20 or 32. The 40×53mm type grenade is also used by other automatic grenade launchers such as the Mk 19 and Mk 47 Striker and are more powerful than the 40×46mm round used in hand-held launchers.

High Explosive (HE) Grenades
Designed primarily for use against vehicles and personnel (with a casualty radius of 5m)

High Explosive; Dual Purpose (HEDP) Grenades
Whilst this round has some armour-piercing capability (penetrating cleanly through 50mm of armour plating, or 350mm of concrete), it is mainly designed for use against armoured vehicles and fortifications.

Practice (P) Grenades
This grenade, whilst not 'live', produces a flash and smoke on firing; intended for realistic simulations and training.

Target Practice Tracer (TPT) Grenade
Although similar to the Practice round, this round also produces a visible light trail similar to other tracer ammunition.

Target Practice (TP) Grenade
This round is inert, although possessing the same ballistic properties as the HE and HEDP rounds. Also used during simulated exercises.

=== Accessories ===
A transport case, weapon and sight harness, ammunition harness and tripod, cradle and toolkit harness are supplied with the weapon; along with a toolkit, aiming light and post. Further customisation via tactical and covert accessories may also be retrofitted.

== Users ==
- Kurdistan – Peshmerga
- South Africa

== See also ==
- Comparison of automatic grenade launchers

Comparable weapons

- Heckler & Koch GMG – 40 mm calibre automatic grenade launcher
- XM174 grenade launcher – 40 mm calibre automatic grenade launcher
- AGS-17 – 30 mm calibre automatic grenade launcher
- Mk 19 grenade launcher – 40 mm automatic grenade launcher
