= List of API blowback firearms =

This is a list of advanced primer ignition blowback firearms (API).

== Assault Rifles ==
Name/ designation	Year of intro	Country of origin	Primary cartridge	Type
APT	1980s	Soviet Union	5.45×39mm	

== Anti Tank Rifles ==
Name/ designation	Year of intro	Country of origin	Primary cartridge	Type
Oerlikon SSG36	1940s	Switzerland	20×105mmB	
Solothurn S-18/100	1940s	Switzerland	20×105mmB	

== Grenade Launchers ==
Name/ designation	Year of intro	Country of origin	Primary cartridge	Type
Mk 19	1968	United States	40x53mm	
Daewoo K4	1993	South Korea	40x53mm	
Heckler & Koch GMG	2000s	Germany	40x53mm	
Norinco LG5	2000s	China	40x53mm	Hybrid of API Blowback and short-recoil
QLU-11	2011	China	35x32mm	Hybrid of API Blowback and short-recoil

== Machine Guns ==
Name/ designation	Year of intro	Country of origin	Primary cartridge	Type
QJZ-171	2017	China	12.7×108mm	Hybrid of API Blowback and short-recoil

== Submachine Guns ==
Name/ designation	Year of intro	Country of origin	Primary cartridge	Type
TZ-45	1944	Italy	9×19mm Parabellum	

== Shotguns ==
Name/ designation	Year of intro	Country of origin	Primary cartridge	Type
Atchisson Assault Shotgun	1972	United States	12 Gauge	
