= Automatic grenade launcher =

Grenade launcher with repeating fire mechanism

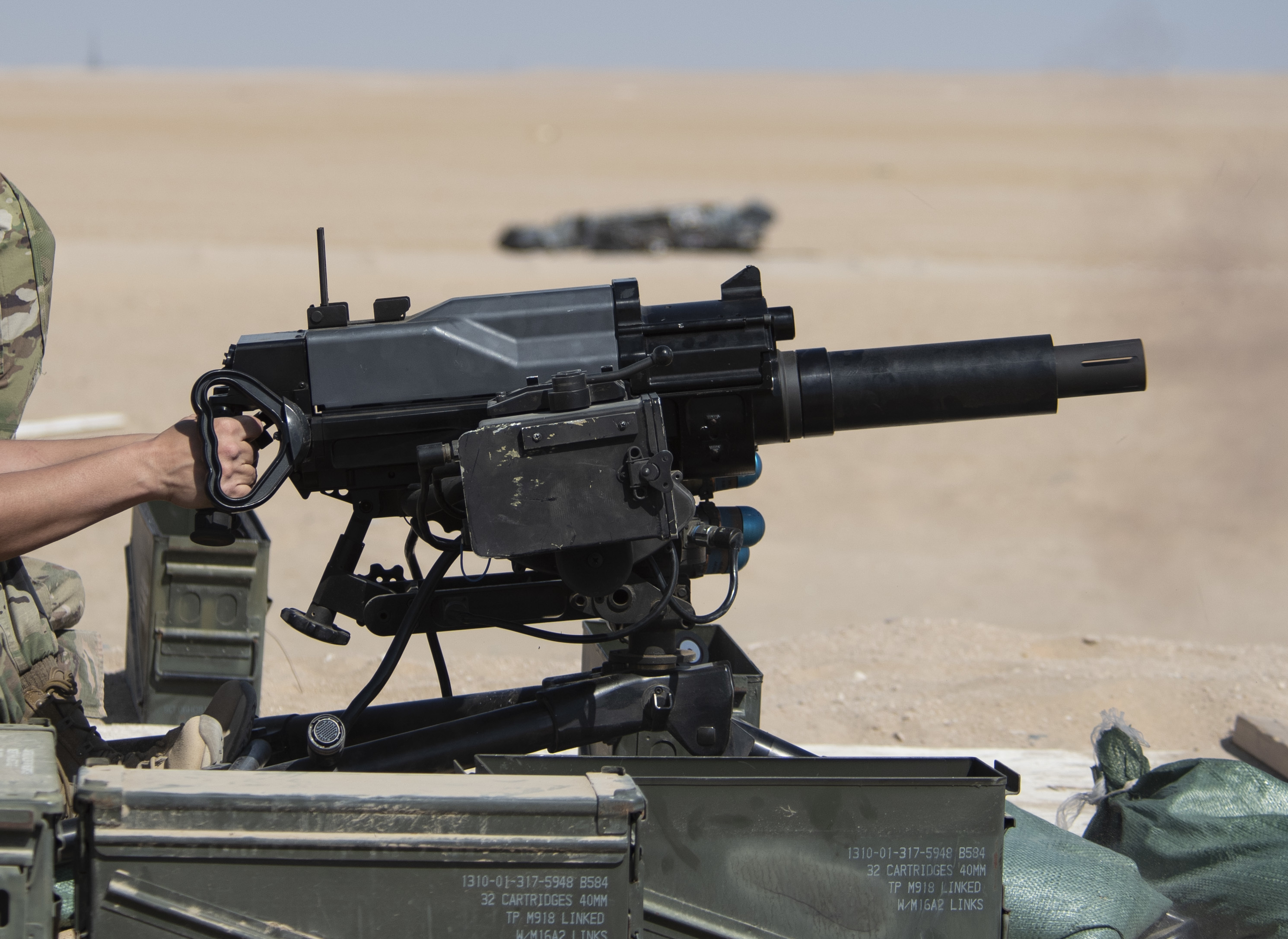
Mk 47 Striker automatic grenade launcher

An automatic grenade launcher (AGL) or grenade machine gun is a grenade launcher that is capable of fully automatic fire, and is typically loaded with either an ammunition belt or magazine.

These weapons are often mounted on vehicles or helicopters, as when these weapons are moved by infantry the weapon, its tripod, and ammunition, are a heavy load, requiring a small team. Other types of grenade launchers are typically much lighter and can easily be carried by just a single soldier.

The Mark 19 Automatic Grenade Launcher, first fielded by the United States in 1966, and still widely used today, weighs 62.5 kg (137.58 lb) when attached to its tripod, and loaded with a box of ammunition. For comparison, the single-shot M79 grenade launcher weighs 2.93 kg (6.45 lb). Regardless of their weight, AGLs are still highly effective, and the Mark 19 is capable of indirect fire up to 2,200 metres, a role traditionally reserved for mortars. Even though the round carries less explosive than a 60mm mortar shell, this is thought to be counterbalanced by its much higher volume of fire.

The most popular caliber for automatic grenade launchers in Western nations has been 40mm. The Soviet Union successfully fielded a 30mm grenade launcher, the AGS-17, during its war in Afghanistan. In 2002, Russia introduced a successor weapon, the AGS-30, and in 2017, the AGS-40 Balkan. Traditional munitions for automatic grenade launchers include high explosive, fragmentation, and shaped charge for attacking light armored vehicles. Less lethal rounds, like tear gas and sponge grenades for crowd control, have also been made. In the 21st century, AGLs have been made with integrated sight/range systems which can set a fused round to detonate precisely on, above, or behind a designated target.

Different weapons use different methods of operation, with blowback and long recoil being two common choices. In all these weapons, the energy released by firing a round loads the next round into the weapon's breech. The Mark 19 is automatically reloaded through the blowback method, where expanding gases blow back the firing bolt.

In the long recoil method the bolt is fixed to the firing chamber, and the whole firing chamber is blown back. These weapons are slightly less accurate, but weigh less than blowback weapons. General Dynamics manufactures a long recoil weapon, the Mark 47 Automatic Grenade Launcher, as does the Spanish firm Santa Bárbara. The LAG-40 manufactured by Santa Bárbara has a relatively low rate of fire of 215 rounds per minute.

== Comparison ==
Name	Country	Year	Image	Caliber	Effective Range	Muzzle velocity	Rate of fire, rpm	Approx. weight (Note: Without ammo, with default sights.)	Feed, rounds	Sights (Note: Normally includes iron sights.)
Mk 19 Mod 3	United States	1966		40×53mm	1,500 m (4,900 ft)	241 m/s (790 ft/s)	325‑375	35.2 kg (78 lb)	Belt, 32, 48	Night vision
AGS-17	Soviet Union	1967		30×29mm grenade	1,700 m (5,600 ft)	185 m/s (610 ft/s)	400	31 kg (68 lb)	Belt, 29	Optical (requires optional mount)
Mk 47 Striker	United States	2005		40x53mm	1,700 m (5,600 ft)	—	225‑300	18 kg (40 lb)	Belt, 32, 48	FCS, Thermal
HK GMG	Germany	1992		40x53mm	1,500 m (4,900 ft)	241 m/s (790 ft/s)	340	29 kg (64 lb)	Belt, 32	Reflex, "Various"
SB-40 LAG	Spain	1984		40x53mm	1,500 m (4,900 ft)	240 m/s (790 ft/s)	215	34 kg (75 lb)	Belt, 24, 32	Night vision
STK 40 AGL	Singapore	1986		40x53mm	1,500 m (4,900 ft)	242 m/s (790 ft/s)	350‑500	33 kg	Belt, 32	Reflex, FCS, Thermal
Daewoo K4	South Korea	1985		40x53mm	1,500 m (4,900 ft)	241 m/s (790 ft/s)	325-375	34.4 kg (76 lb)	Belt, 24, 48	KAN/TVS-5 night vision scope can be attached
Howa Type 96	Japan	1996		40x56mm	1,500 m (4,900 ft)	242 m/s (790 ft/s)	250‑350	24.5 kg (54 lb)	Belt, 50	Ladder sights
Denel Y3 AGL	South Africa	1992		40x53mm	2,176 m (7,100 ft)	242 m/s (790 ft/s)	280‑320	32 kg (71 lb)	Belt, 20	Optical, Indirect electronic sight
UAG-40	Ukraine	2016		40x53mm	2,200 m (7,200 ft)	240 m/s (790 ft/s)	400	31 kg (68 lb)	Belt, 32	Optical, Infrared, Photo‑Visual, Electronic
AGA-40 Md.85 (Note: Production status is unclear.)	Romania	1985		40x74.5mm	1,400 m (4,600 ft)	216 m/s (710 ft/s)	380‑450	33 kg (73 lb)	Mag., 10	Ladder sights
AGS‑30 Atlant	Russia	1990		30x29mm	2,100 m (6,900 ft)	185 m/s (610 ft/s)	400	17.5 kg (39 lb)	Belt, 29	Optical, Day‑Night, Radar sight
AGS‑40 Balkan	Russia	2017		40x53mm (caseless)	2,500 m (8,200 ft)	225 m/s (740 ft/s)	400	32 kg (71 lb)	Belt, 20	Optical
QLZ-87 (Note: Can be fired from bipod.)	China	1987		35x32mm	1,700 m (5,600 ft)	200 m/s (660 ft/s)	500	12 kg (26 lb)/20 kg (44 lb)	Mag., 6, 9, 12, 15	Optical
QLZ-04	China	2004		35x32mm	1,750 m (5,740 ft)	200 m/s (660 ft/s)	350-400	20 kg (44 lb)	Belt, 30	Optical
RDS40-AGL	Turkey	2022		40x53mm	2,000 m (6,600 ft)	240 m/s (790 ft/s)	300-375	35 kg (77 lb)	Belt, 32,48	

== Ammunition ==
	40×74.5mm		30×29mm		40mm "Balkan"	35×32mm	
	HE	HEAT	VOG-30	GPD-30	7P39	HE	HEAT
Max. range	1,550 m (5,090 ft)		1,700 m (5,600 ft)	2,100 m (6,900 ft)	2,500 m (8,200 ft)	1,750 m (5,740 ft)	
Muzzle velocity	223 m/s (730 ft/s)		185 m/s (610 ft/s)		—	200 m/s (660 ft/s)	
Weight	490 g (1.08 lb)		348 g (0.767 lb)	340 g (0.75 lb)	430 g (0.95 lb)	—	—
Shell weight	260 g (0.57 lb)		275 g (0.606 lb)		—	—	—
Filling	—	—	47 g (1.7 oz)	—	90 g (3.2 oz)	—	—
Kill radius/area	10 m (33 ft)	—	90 m^{2} (970 sq ft)	120 m^{2} (1,300 sq ft)	—	—	—
Penetration	—	50 mm (2.0 in)	—	—	—	—	80 mm (3.1 in)

== See also ==
- List of grenade launchers
- Taubina AG-2 Grenade Launcher, a Soviet prototype automatic grenade launcher from Interbellum period.
- Vasilyek
- XM174, US low velocity (40x46mm) automatic grenade launcher tested and in limited use in Vietnam
- Raufoss Mk 211
