= Type 96 armored personnel carrier =

Japanese wheeled armoured vehicle

Type 96 wheeled armored personnel carrier
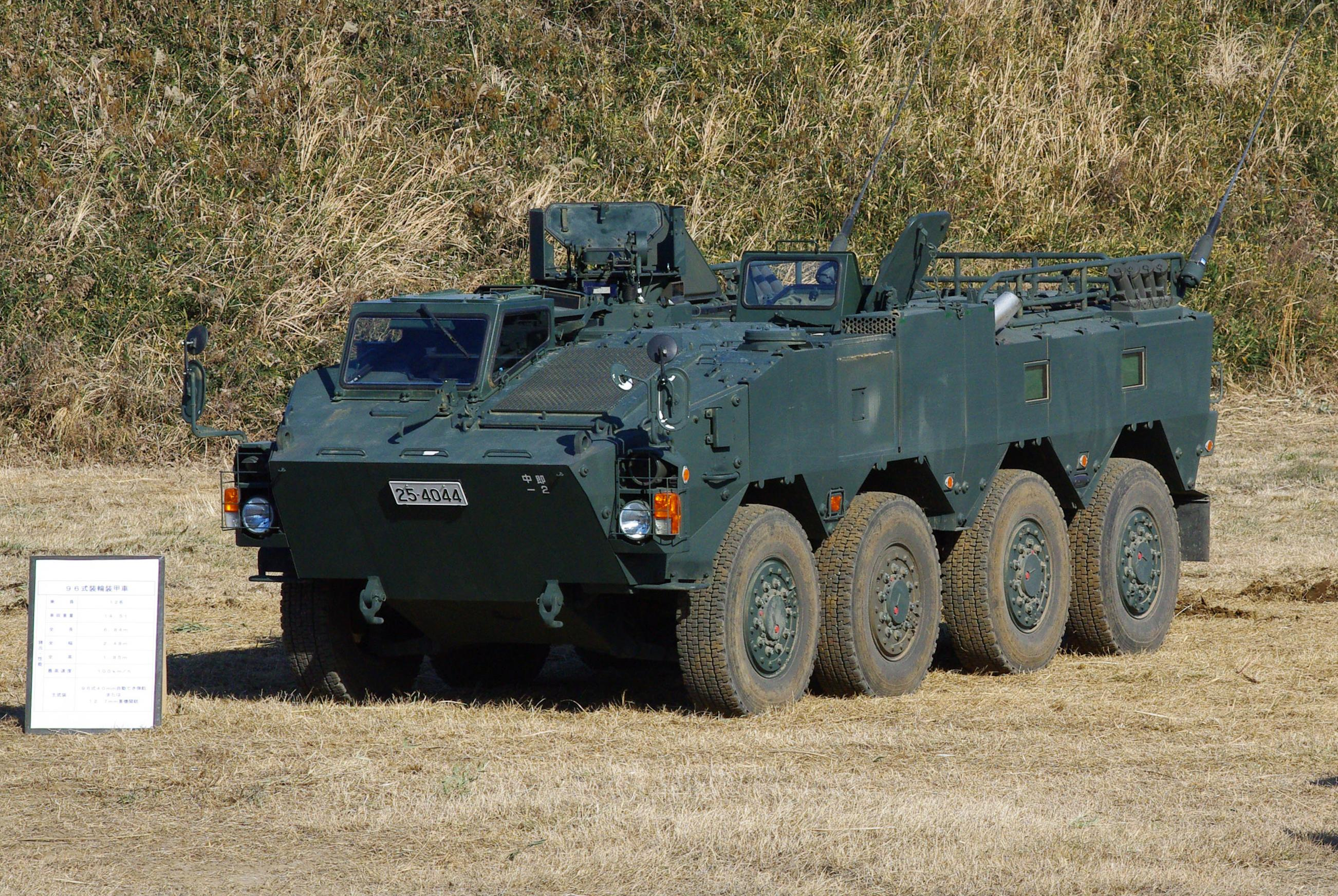
- A Type 96 on display at Narashino
- Type: Armored personnel carrier
- Place of origin: Japan

Service history
- In service: 1996–present
- Used by: Japan

Production history
- Manufacturer: Komatsu
- Unit cost: US$1.6 million (2012); 120 million yen (2014)
- Produced: 1996–present
- No. built: 365 (2014)

Specifications
- Mass: 14.6 tonnes (16.1 short tons)
- Length: 6.84 metres (269 in)
- Width: 2.48 metres (98 in)
- Height: 1.85 metres (73 in)
- Crew: 2 + 8
- Main armament: 1× Type 96 40mm Automatic grenade launcher or 1× 12.7 mm M2HB machine gun
- Engine: Mitsubishi 6D40 water-cooled 6-cylinder diesel 360 hp
- Suspension: 8×8 wheeled
- Operational range: 500 kilometres (310 mi)
- Maximum speed: 100 kilometres per hour (62 mph) (road)

The Type 96 wheeled armored personnel carrier (96式装輪装甲車, kyuu-roku-shiki-sourin-soukou-sha) is an armoured vehicle that entered service with Japan in 1996, manufactured by Komatsu. This vehicle complements the existing fleet of tracked Type 73 armored personnel carriers already in service with plans to eventually replace it.

== History ==
Komatsu produced the first Type 96 in 1996 in service with the JGSDF. Development first started in 1992 with a prototype vehicle produced in 1994.

In March 2021, a Type 96 APC was shown with Type 70 MiclicC system mine clearing equipment.

== Design ==
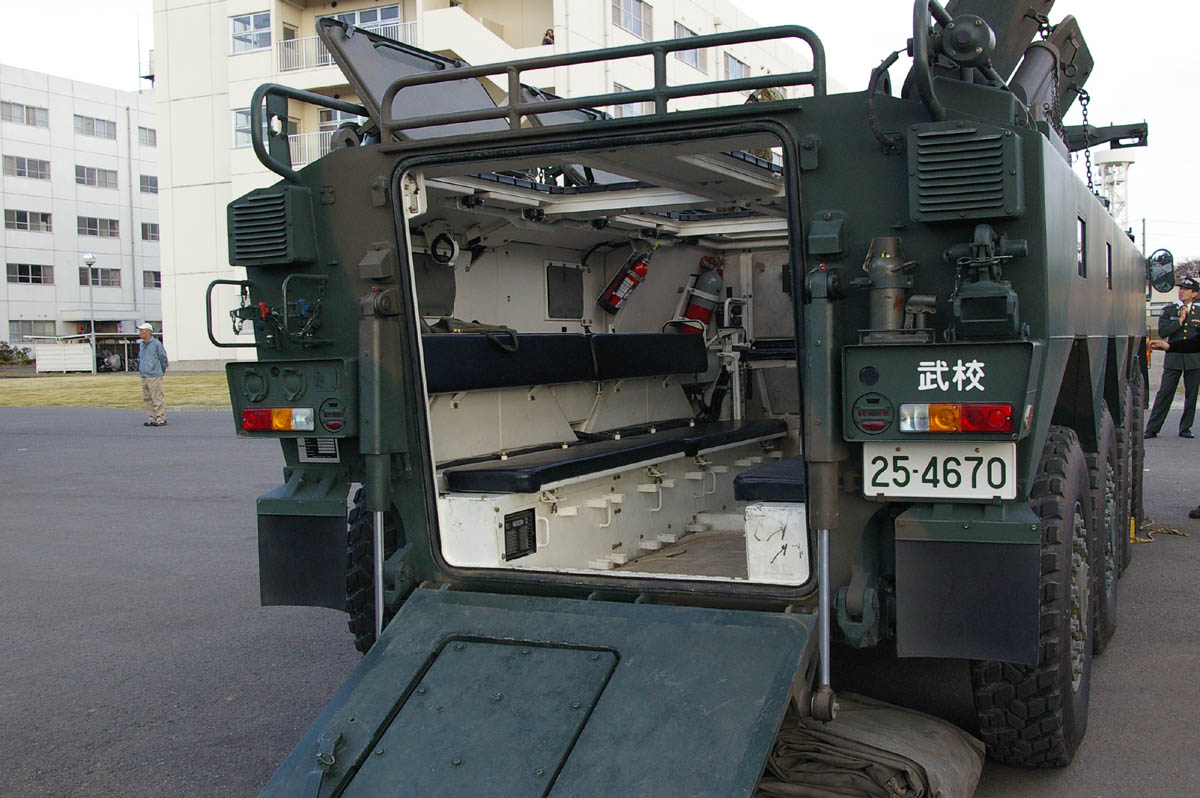
A Type 96 on display at JGSDF Camp Matsudo

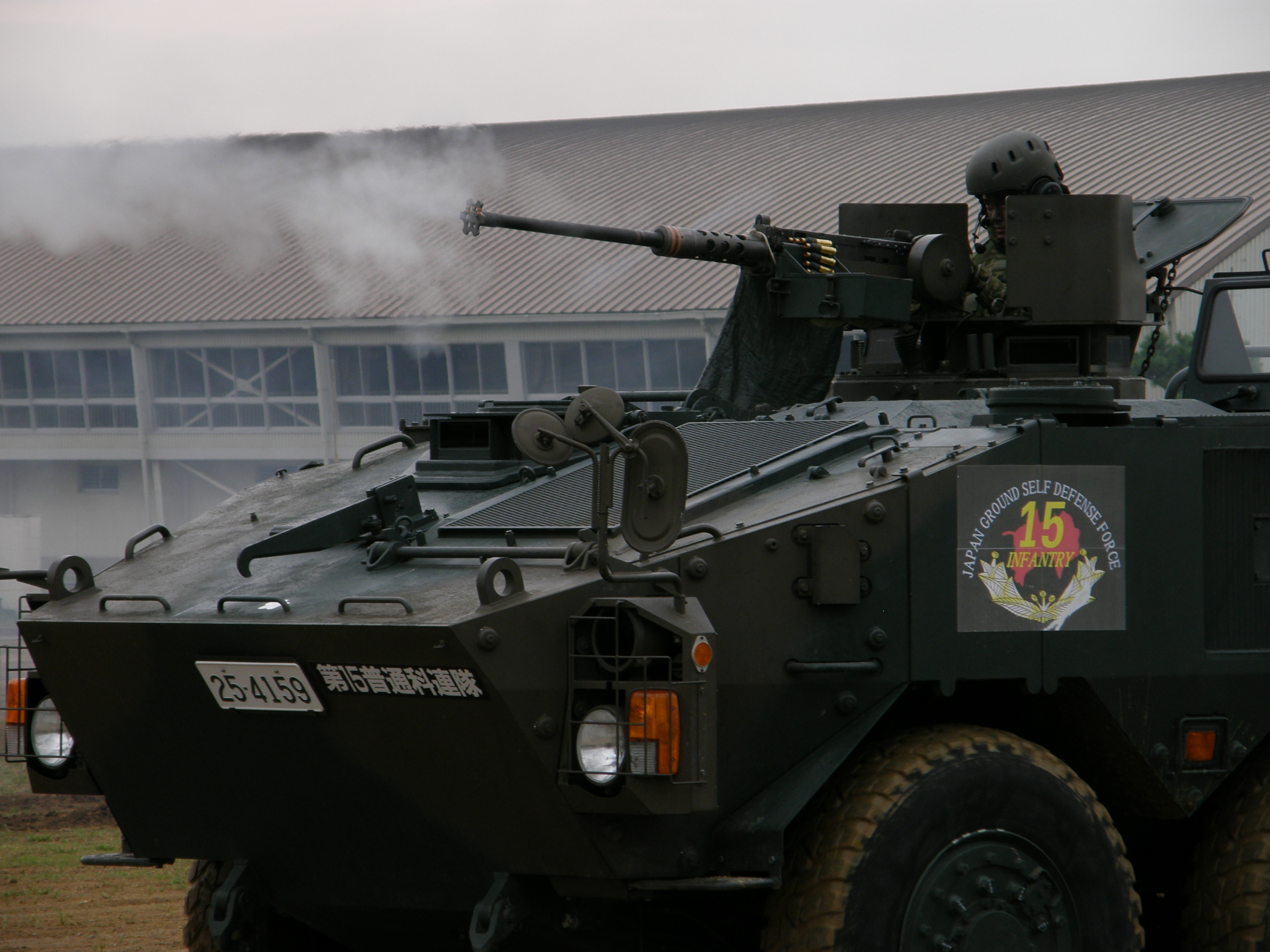
A soldier of the JGSDF's 15th Infantry Regiment fire the Sumitomo M2 HMG.

The driver sits on the right side of the vehicle with the engine to his left, which also has its own hatch. This position is fitted with three periscopes, the center of which can be replaced by a passive night vision periscope. Behind the driver is the commander/gunner in a cupola that traverses 360° that can carry either a 40 mm grenade launcher (Type A) or a .50 caliber (12.7 mm) M2HB machine gun (Type B).

Its suspension is based on a double wishbone type suspension with torsion bars on the front two axles and trailing arm type torsion bars on the rear two axles. The Type 96 can be driven between all-wheel drive (8×8) and rear 2-axle drive (4×8).

The passenger compartment has space for 8 infantrymen who can use 2 firing ports on each side. They can dismount via rear hydraulic ramp, but a built-in door can be used in case the hydraulics do not work. In case of casualty evacuation, the spacious interior can be used to load stretchers inside.

When the Type 96 was deployed to Iraq previously, it appeared that the driver's position was fitted with an assembly of three windows to enable the person to drive with his head out of the vehicle for greater situational awareness while still protected from small-arms fire. It also included additional armor for protection. The Central Readiness Regiment (CRR) uses it with additional armor installed on the sides, which is known as the "Type 96 Wheeled Armored Vehicle Type 2".

== Replacement ==
On 10 January 2017, a new 8×8 APC prototype called the Wheeled Armoured Vehicle (Improved) was handed off to the JSDF to replace the 365 Type 96 vehicles in service. Developed by the Japanese Defense Ministry in collaboration with Komatsu Limited, this next generation wheeled vehicle was designed to offer more protection against improvised explosive devices (IEDs) with a similar layout to the Patria AMV and Stryker, providing a family of different vehicles on a common chassis. The new vehicle proposed is longer, higher and heavier than the Type 96. Around US$41 million was invested by the Ministry of Defense.

The Wheeled Armoured Vehicle (Improved) prototype is 8.4 m (28 ft) long, 2.5 m (8.2 ft) wide, and 2.9 m (9.5 ft) high, weighing 20 tons and carries two crew and nine troops with a new more powerful 500 hp diesel engine and strengthened suspension to run at 100 km/h. The vehicle will equip JGSDF combat and combat-support units for peacekeeping operations as well as “counter island invasion” scenarios. Trials of the prototype were intended to continue until 2019. This was due to issues with the armor quality of the prototypes. The Japanese Ministry of Defense announced that further prototype testing would end in 2018, due to concerns of a lack of adequate bulletproofing material that can be used and whether revisions can be made to meet the target production and the costs in time.

The MOD reported that they would continue to look for suitable APCs to replace the Type 96. Among the vehicles tested included the LAV 6.0, the Patria AMV and the Mitsubishi Mobile Armored Vehicle.

On 9 December 2022, the Japanese Ministry of Defense awarded a contract for the Patria AMV through Patria Japan.

== Operators ==
- Japan: 365 vehicles had been produced as of 2014.
