= Mk 19 grenade launcher =

Mk 19
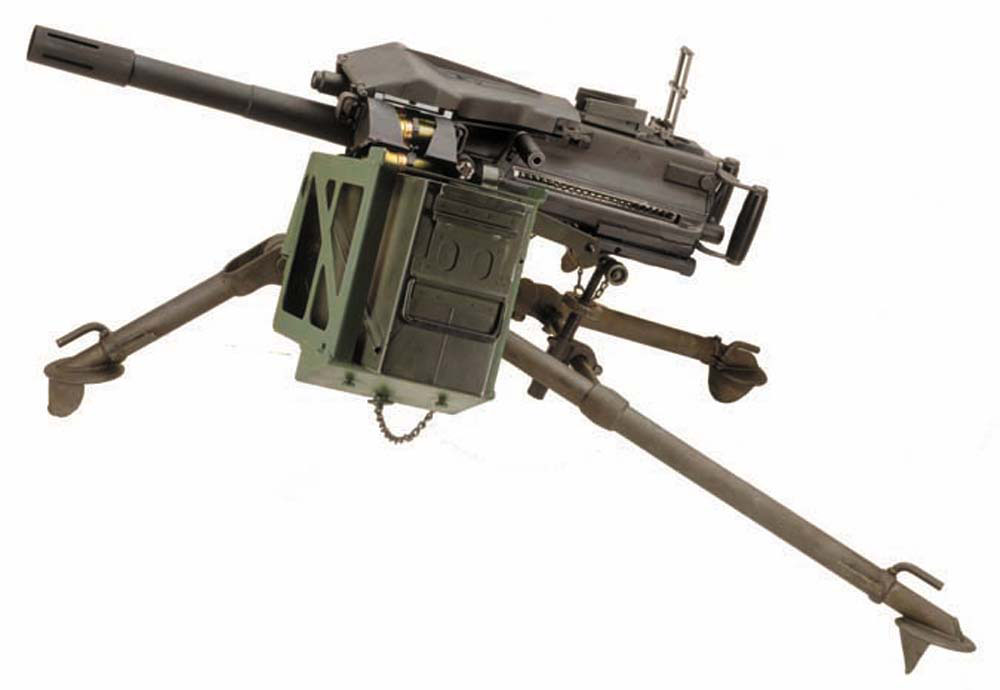
- A Mk 19 40 mm grenade launcher mounted on an M3 tripod
- Type: Automatic grenade launcher
- Place of origin: United States

Service history
- In service: 1968–present
- Used by: See Users
- Wars: Cold War; Vietnam War; Sino-Vietnamese War; Cambodian–Vietnamese War; Sino-Vietnamese conflicts (1979-1991); Third Indochina War; Soviet–Afghan War; Persian Gulf War; Global War on Terrorism; War in Afghanistan; Iraq War; 2006 Lebanon War; Kurdish–Turkish conflict (1978–present); Mexican drug war; 2013 Lahad Datu standoff; Syrian Civil War; Yemeni Civil War; Saudi Arabian-led intervention in Yemen; Russo-Ukrainian War; Gaza war

Production history
- Designer: Naval Ordnance Station Louisville, George M. Chinn
- Designed: 1966
- Manufacturer: Saco Defense Industries (now a division of General Dynamics Ordnance and Tactical Systems), Combined Service Forces, MKEK
- Unit cost: $20,000
- Produced: 1968–present
- Variants: Mk 19 Mod 0, Mk 19 Mod 1, Mk 19 Mod 2, Mk 19 Mod 3, Mk 19 Mod 4

Specifications
- Mass: 77.6 pounds (35.2 kg) (empty, without accessories)
- Length: 43.1 inches (1,090 mm)
- Barrel length: 16.25 inches (413 mm)
- Width: 9.46 inches (240.4 mm)
- Height: 7.8 inches (199 mm)
- Cartridge: 40×53 mm
- Action: API blowback
- Rate of fire: 325-375rpm (cyclic); 40 rpm (sustained); 60 rpm (rapid)
- Muzzle velocity: 750–790 feet per second (230–240 m/s) (average)
- Effective firing range: 1,500 m (1,600 yd)
- Maximum firing range: 2,212 m (2,419 yd)
- Feed system: 32- or 48-grenade belt
- Sights: Iron

The Mk 19 grenade launcher (pronounced Mark 19) is an American 40 mm belt-fed automatic grenade launcher that was first developed during the Vietnam War.

== Overview ==
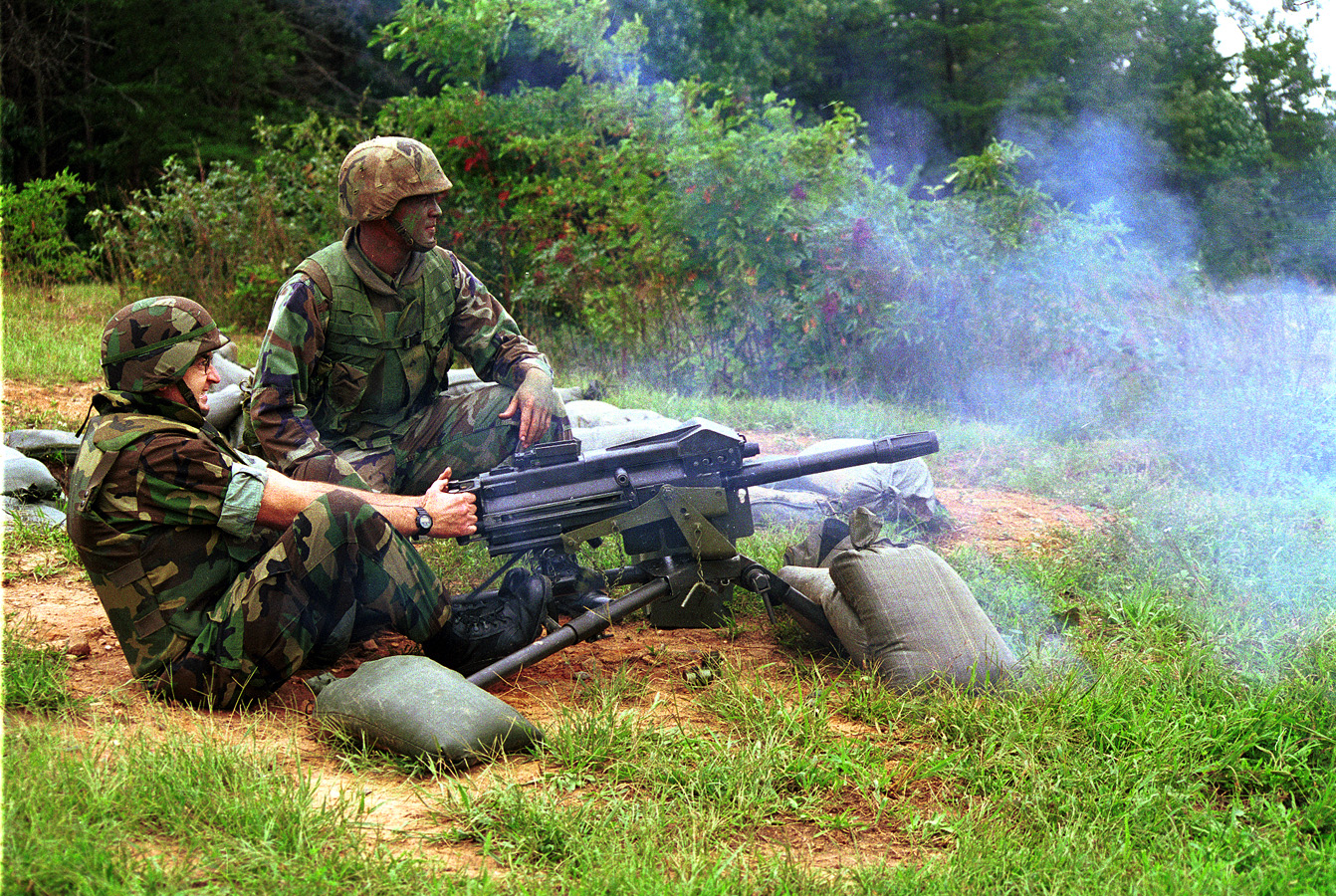
A U.S. Marine fires a Mk 19 40 mm grenade launcher in Quantico, Virginia in September 2000.

The Mk 19 is a belt-fed, blowback-operated, air-cooled, crew-served, fully-automatic weapon that is designed not to cook off. It fires 40 mm grenades at a cyclic rate of 325 to 375 rounds per minute, giving a practical rate of fire of 60 rounds per minute (rapid) and 40 rounds per minute (sustained). The weapon operates on the blowback principle, which uses the chamber pressure from each fired round to load and re-cock the weapon. The Mk 19 can launch its grenade at a maximum distance of 2,212 meters (2,419 yd), though its effective range to a point target is about 1,500 meters (1,600 yd), since the large rear leaf sight is only graduated as far. The nearest safe distance to launch the grenade is 310 meters in training and 75 meters in combat. Though the Mk 19 has a flash suppressor, it serves only to save the eyesight of its operator, not concealing the weapon's position. For night operation, a picatinny rail quadrant sight can be added for thermal and night vision optics.

The Mk 19A is a man-portable crew-served weapon that can fire from a tripod-mounted position or from a vehicle mount, with the latter being the preferred method, as the weapon alone weighs 77.6 pounds (35.2 kg). The primary ammunition for it is the high-explosive dual-purpose M430 grenade. On impact, the grenade can kill anyone within a radius of 5 meters (16 ft), and wound them within a radius of 15 metres (49 ft). It can also penetrate 2 inches (5.1 cm) of rolled homogeneous armor with a direct hit (0-degree obliquity), which means it can penetrate most infantry fighting vehicles and armored personnel carriers. It is especially effective when used against enemy infantry formations. The ammunition comes in cans that hold a 32- or 48-grenade belt weighing 42 and 60 pounds (19 and 27 kg), respectively. Due to its low recoil and comparatively light weight, it has been adapted for use on many different platforms, including small attack boats, fast attack vehicles such as the Humvee (HMMWV), AAV and Stryker, military jeeps, and a large variety of naval mounts.

The Mk 19 automatic grenade launcher replaced the earlier Mk 18 hand-cranked multiple grenade launcher. The 40 mm ammunition used (40×53 mm) is not interchangeable with that used in the M203 (40×46 mm). The M203 ammunition develops a lower chamber pressure, and resultant lower muzzle velocity and range, compared to ammunition loaded for the Mk 19. The Mk 19 fires from an open bolt. The rounds are mechanically fed onto the bolt face with the pull of the charging handles. When the trigger is pressed, the bolt closes, and the firing pin is released. The recoil blows back the bolt, feeds a new round onto the bolt face, which pushes the expended casing off the bolt face.

Production of the Mk 19 is managed by Saco Defense Industries, now a division of General Dynamics Ordnance and Tactical Systems (GDOTS).

In November 2014, General Dynamics entered into an agreement with Advanced Material Engineering Pte Ltd, a subsidiary of Singapore Technologies Kinetics, to manufacture 40 mm high-velocity airburst ammunition for the U.S. military. The 40 mm airburst grenade uses a programmable, time-based fuse that computes and programs the detonation time into it, which counts down once fired to zero to detonate at the intended target point. The airburst ammunition is compatible with the Mk 19, which would give it greater effectiveness and lethality, particularly against concealed and defilade targets.

The Mk 19 is used as part of the Şahin counter unmanned air system (C-UAS) developed by Aselsan, which entered service with the Turkish Armed Forces in July 2022 and uses Atom 40 mm ammunition to detect and destroy mini and micro UAVs out to 700 meters.

== Variants ==
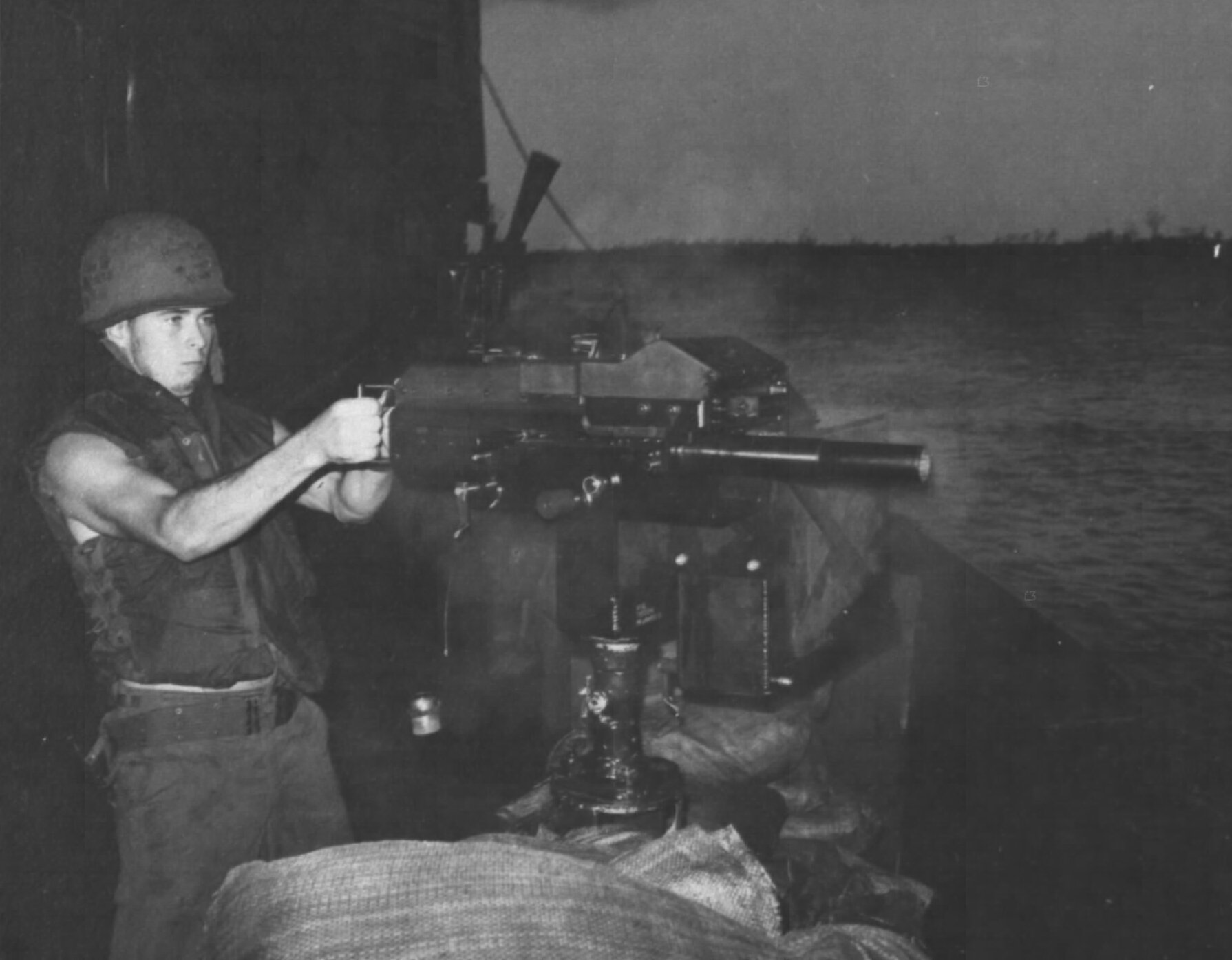
US Navy crewman fires a Mk 19 Mod 0 in July 1969

"Although the Mk 19 is a recent entry into the Army’s inventory, development began in 1963. The first version was a hand-cranked, multiple grenade launcher called the Mk 18. In 1966 the need for more firepower inspired the development of a self-powered 40-mm machine gun called the Mk 19 MOD 0. This model was neither reliable nor safe enough for use as a military weapon system. Product improvements begun in 1971 resulted in the 1972 MOD 1, of which only six were produced. The MOD 1 performed effectively in Navy riverine patrol craft and broader applications for the Mk 19 were found. In 1973 the Navy developed the MOD 2, which featured improved reliability, safety, and maintainability. In 1976 a complete redesign resulted in the Mk 19, MOD 3, which the Army adopted in 1983. The Army now uses the Mk 19 within the tactical environment for defense, retrograde, patrolling, rear area security, urban operations, and special operations."

== Users ==
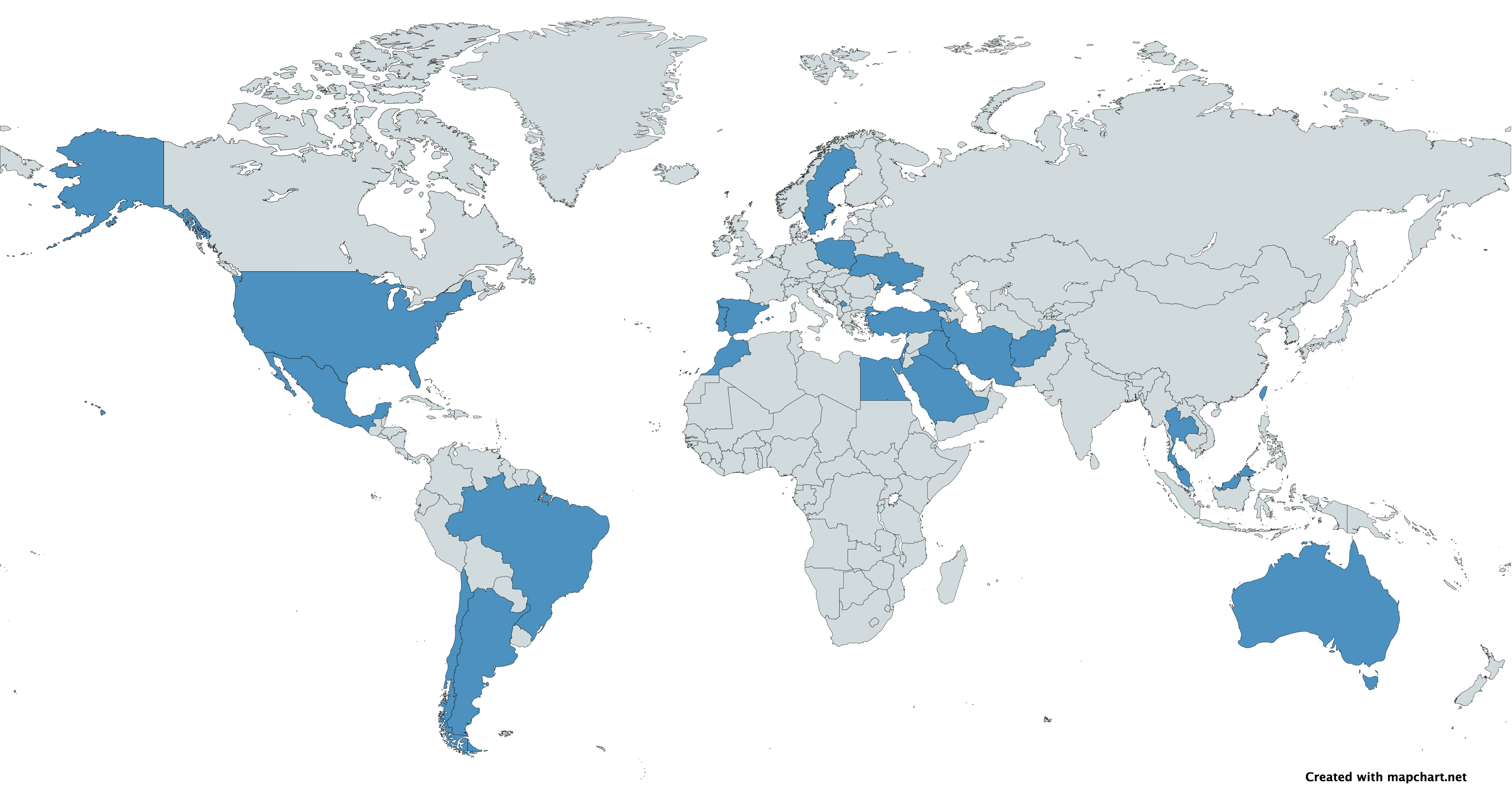
Map with Mk 19 grenade launcher users in blue

GDOTS has built nearly 35,000 Mk 19 Mod 3 systems for roughly 30 customers since 1984. Users of the Mk 19 include:

- Afghanistan: Unknown numbers were given to the Afghan army at an unknown period of time, captured and in use by the Taliban.
- Argentina: Argentine Marines.
- Australia
- Brazil: Used by the Brazilian Marine Corps.
- Chile: Used by the Chilean Army and the Chilean Marine Corps.
- Egypt: Manufactured locally by Helwan.
- Georgia
- Iran
- Iraq: Used by Iraqi special forces on Humvees.
- Israel: Adopted by the Israeli Defence Forces (under the name "Maklar", for mikla rimonim or "grenade machinegun"), to be fielded in infantry and mechanized units. The Mk 19 was formerly manufactured locally.
- Japan: Mk 19 mounted on AAV7 amphibious vehicle used by Amphibious Rapid Deployment Brigade
- Kosovo: Kosovo Security Forces.
- Lebanon
- Malaysia
- Mexico:
- Moldova
- Morocco: Moroccan Army.
- Pakistan
- Poland
- Portugal: Used by the Portuguese Army.
- Saudi Arabia
- Spain
- Sweden: Designated Grsp 92. Used by Kustjägarna and Amfibiebataljonen and also by the 31st Airborne Battalion
- Taiwan
- Thailand:
- Turkey: Produced under licence by MKEK. Used by Turkish Land Forces.
- Ukraine
- United States: Currently in widespread use throughout the U.S. Armed Forces.
- Vietnam: Used in the Sino-Vietnamese War.
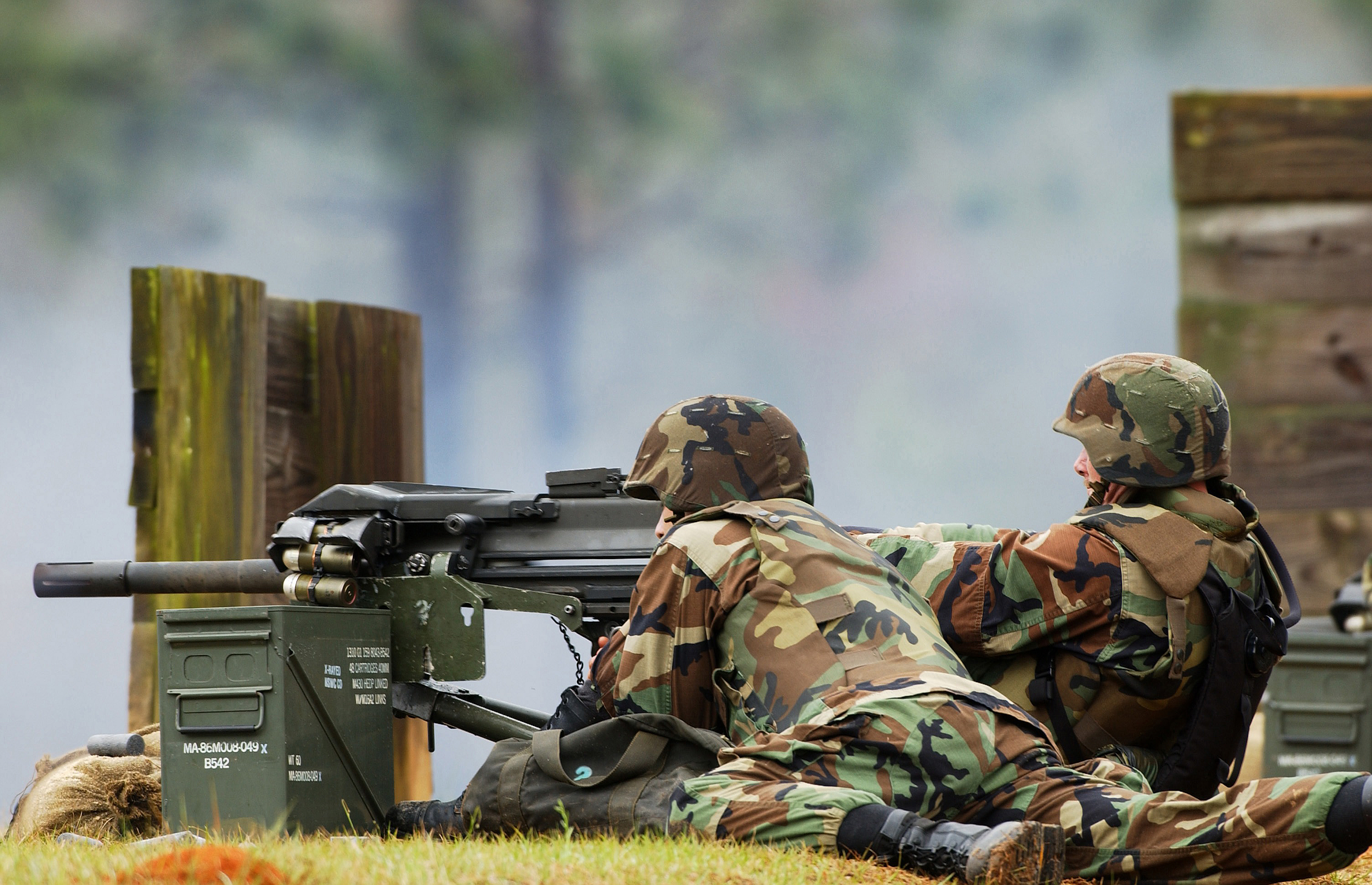
U.S. Navy sailors fire a Mk 19 40 mm grenade launcher during a training exercise in March 2003.

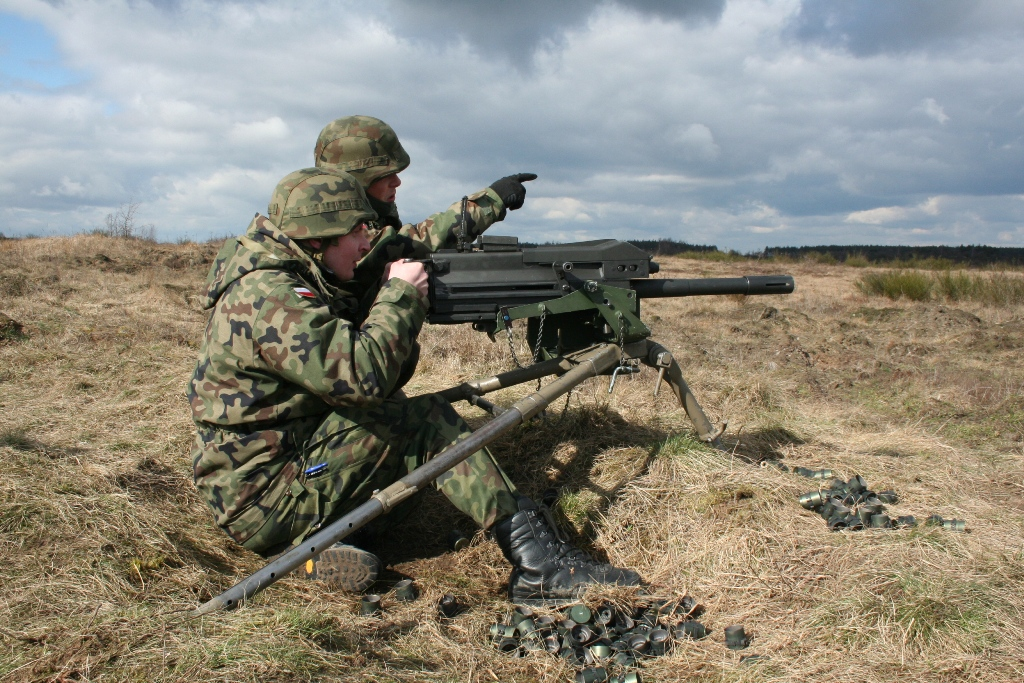
Mk 19 in use by Polish Land Forces

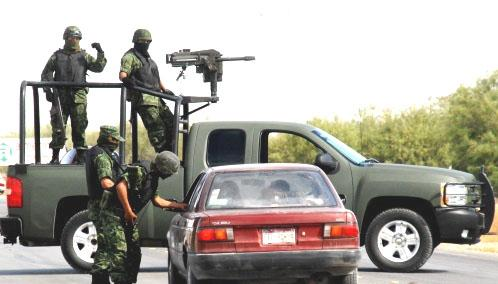
A Mexican Army Chevrolet Silverado equipped with a Mk 19 at a military checkpoint in March 2009

== Civilian availability ==
A single transferable Mk 19 MOD 0 is on the American NFA registry, as it qualifies as both a destructive device (as per the NFA) and as a machine gun (under the Hughes Amendment) and was sold for over $500,000 in 2024.

== See also ==
- Mk 47 Mod 0 Striker, U.S. military successor in limited service
- XM174 grenade launcher, predecessor used by the U.S. military during the Vietnam War
- U.S. Navy equipment designations
- List of API blowback firearms
- List of grenade launchers
- Comparison of automatic grenade launchers

=== Weapons of comparable role, performance and era ===
- AGS-17 – (Soviet Union)
- AGS-30 – (Russia)
- AGS-40 – (Russia)
- Heckler & Koch GMG – (Germany)
- QLZ-87 – (China)
- QLZ-04 – (China)
- K4 grenade launcher – (South Korea)
- Howa Type 96 – (Japan)
- UAG-40 – (Ukraine)
