= Howa Type 96 =

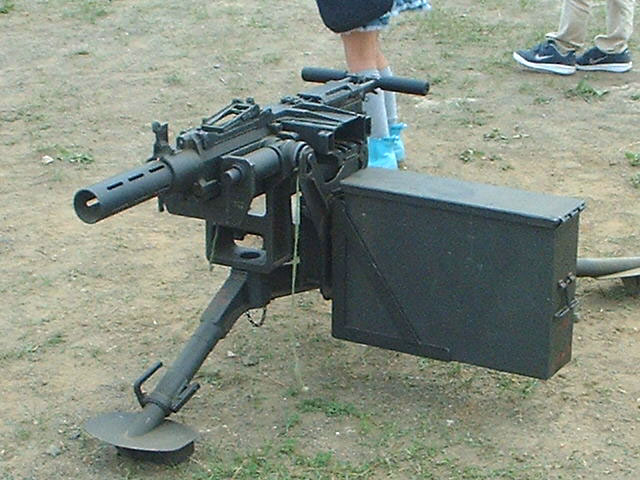
- Howa Type 96 AGL on display
- Type: Automatic grenade launcher
- Place of origin: Japan

Service history
- In service: 1996–present
- Used by: Japan

Production history
- Designer: Howa
- Manufacturer: Howa
- Produced: 1996–present

Specifications
- Mass: 24.5 kg
- Length: 975 mm
- Barrel length: 454 mm
- Cartridge: 40×56mm
- Caliber: 40 mm
- Action: Blow forward
- Rate of fire: 250-350 rpm
- Maximum firing range: 1500 m
- Feed system: 50-grenades belt
- Sights: Ladder

The Howa Type 96 automatic grenade launcher (AGL) (96式40mm自動てき弾銃, 96-shiki 40-miri jidōtekidanjū) is a Japanese automatic grenade launcher made by Howa since 1996.

== History ==
With the need of a heavy fire support weapon in Japan Self-Defense Forces (JSDF) service aside from the use of the Sumitomo Type 62 GPMG and the Sumitomo M2HB machine gun, Howa first created and produced the weapon in 1996.

== Use ==
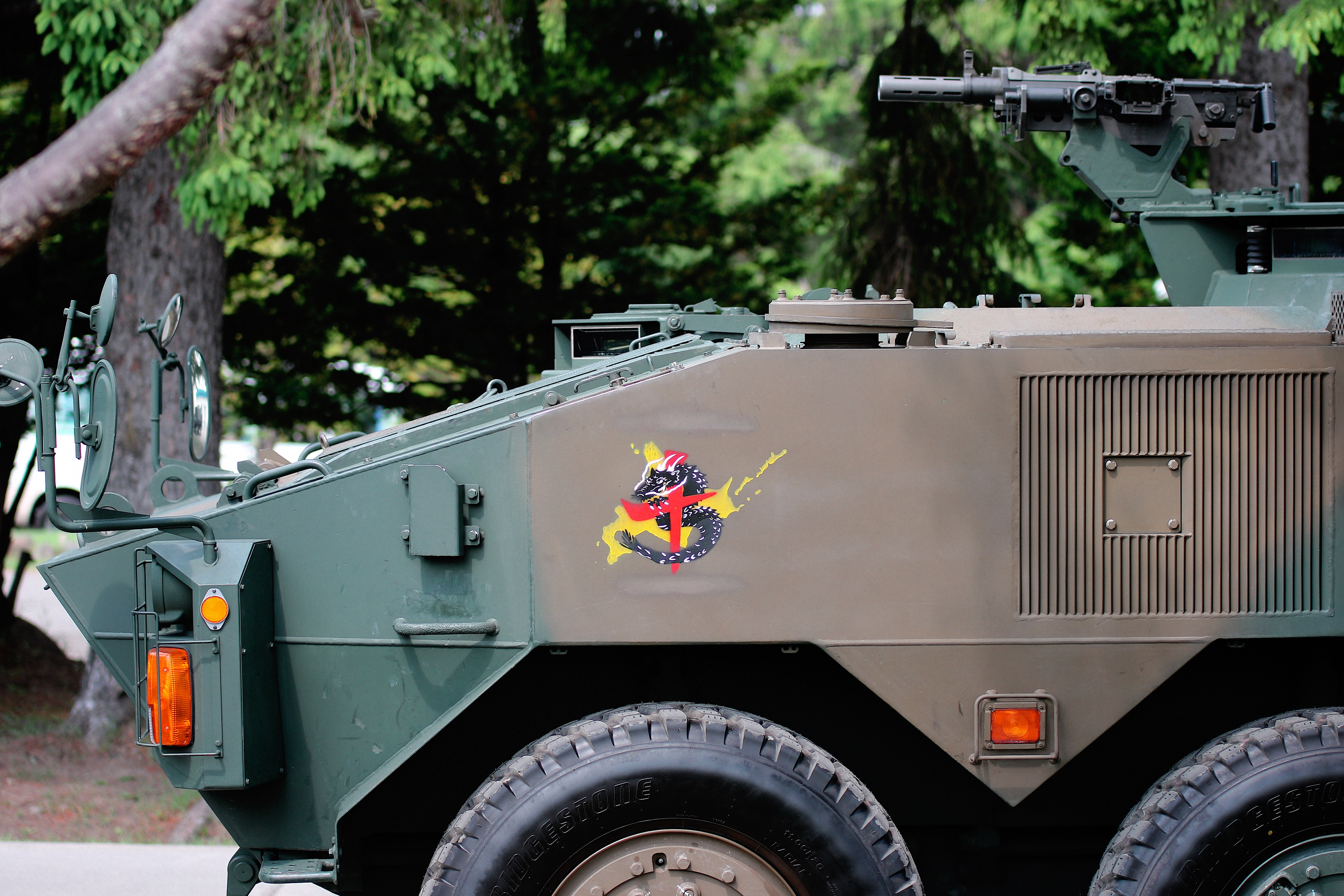
The Type 96 AGL mounted on top of a Type 96 APC

The Howa Type 96 can be used by both infantry and armored vehicles, the former with a tripod and the latter by being placed on a weapon mount. It is seen as one of the main weapons mounted on the Type 96 armored personnel carrier.

== Operational details ==
On the left side of the Type 96 is a feeding bay where the 40 mm grenades belt can be loaded onto the AGL.

It can be placed on a tripod mount on the ground if required and can also be used as an anti-personnel and anti-armoured vehicle grenade by attaching a tripod mount. It uses a belt-linked feeding system and has single- and continuous-fire capabilities. For automatic reloading, a blow-forward system is used, in which the barrel is moved back and forth and loaded, rather than by a loose bottom.

Ammunition is supplied from a magazine on the left side of the barrel. The type of ammunition used is Daikin Industries 40x56mm "40 mm anti-personnel and light armour-piercing round" (ammunition length 112 mm, weight 371 g), a multi-purpose grenade with moulded explosive. In addition, a '40 mm training round' is also available. It is not interchangeable with the 40x53 mm Mk 19 grenade launcher equipped by the AAV7 amphibious vehicle operated by the Japan Ground Self-Defence Force.

A variant with an additional sight was introduced in the 2011 Fuji General Firepower Exercise.

== See also ==
- Comparison of automatic grenade launchers
