= Mk 47 Striker =

American-made automatic grenade launcher

Mk 47 grenade launcher
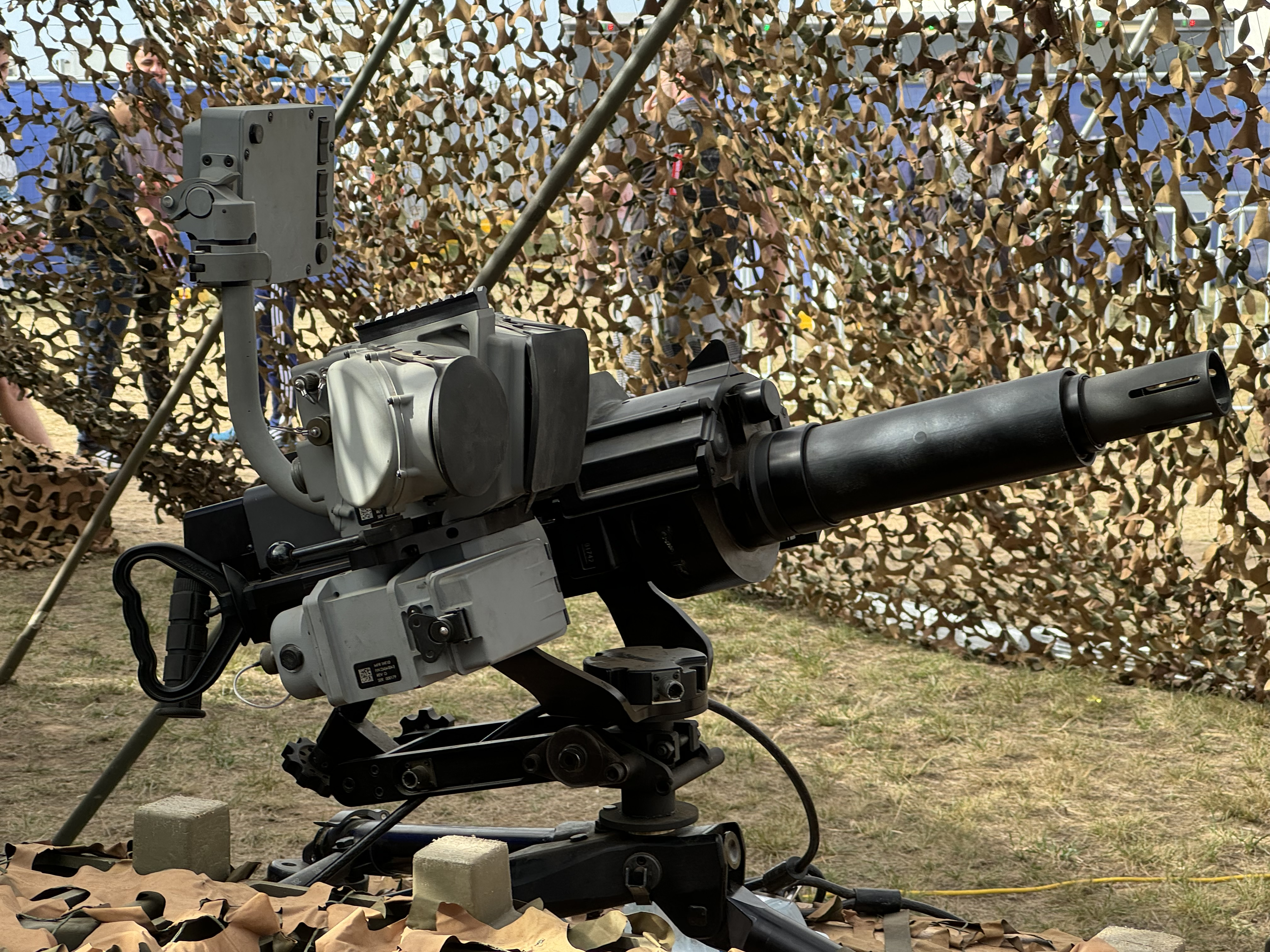
- Closeup of the Mk 47 Striker during 2025 Avalon Airshow in Australia
- Type: Automatic grenade launcher
- Place of origin: United States

Service history
- In service: 2006–present

Production history
- Designer: Naval Surface Warfare Center, Crane
- Designed: 2000s
- Manufacturer: General Dynamics - Armament and Technical Products; Colt CZ Group
- Produced: 2006–present
- Variants: Mk 47 Mod 0, Mk 47 Mod 1

Specifications
- Mass: Gun: 39.6 pounds (18.0 kg)
- Length: 37 inches (940 mm)
- Barrel length: 24.02 inches (610 mm)
- Width: 10.04 inches (255 mm)
- Height: 8.07 inches (205 mm)
- Cartridge: 40×53mm
- Action: Short-recoil
- Effective firing range: 1,700 m (5,600 ft)
- Feed system: Belt
- Sights: AN/PAS-13 Heavy Thermal Weapon Sight, by Raytheon

The Mk 47 or Striker 40 is a 40mm automatic grenade launcher with an integrated fire control system, capable of launching smart programmable 40mm air burst grenades in addition to various unguided rounds.

In addition to being able to fire all NATO standard high-velocity 40mm rounds like the Mk 19 grenade launcher, it can fire Mk 285 smart grenades that can be programmed to air burst after a set distance. A computerized sight allows the user to set this distance.

== Program timeline ==
- July 2006: General Dynamics awarded $23 million contract for Mk 47 Mod 0 production. The award is part of a five-year Indefinite Delivery Indefinite Quantity contract with a total potential value of $82 million. Work will be completed at General Dynamics’ facility in Saco, Maine. General Dynamics is partnered with Raytheon (Dallas, Texas/Forest, Miss.) to build the Lightweight Video System (LVS) Fire Control. Program administration will be conducted at General Dynamics' Vermont-based Burlington Technology Center.
- February 2009: General Dynamics awarded $12 million contract for Mk 47 Mod 0 production.
- January 3, 2024: Colt CZ Group acquired ownership of the Mk 47 40mm Advanced Lightweight Grenade Launcher system from General Dynamics Ordnance and Tactical Systems (GD-OTS).

== Users ==
The US military and the Israel Defence Forces have fielded limited numbers of MK 47 Mod 0 systems, with approximately 1,500 in US service.

- Australia: Mk 47 Mod 1 Australian Defence Force $47 million contract for 200 designated Light Weight Automatic Grenade Launcher (LWAGL), to be delivered to the ADF from the third quarter of 2016 until mid 2017 to replace Mk 19. Fitted with the Lightweight Video Sight (LVS2) sighting system with integrated colour video and thermal imaging.
- Israel: Mk 47 Mod 0 Israel Defense Forces $24.9 million contract signed in 2010 for 130. Deliveries are scheduled to begin in January 2012 and be completed by August 2012 to replace Mk 19.
- United States: Mk 47 Mod 0 US Special Operations Command (USSOCOM) units, including both Army and Navy, in service in Iraq and Afghanistan from 2006 designated the Advanced Lightweight Grenade Launcher (ALGL). Now being used by USSOCOM units in Syria.

== See also ==
- Comparison of automatic grenade launchers
- Ground Mobility Vehicle – (US)SOCOM program
- XM307 Advanced Crew Served Weapon
- Raufoss Mk 211
