= XM174 grenade launcher =

XM174
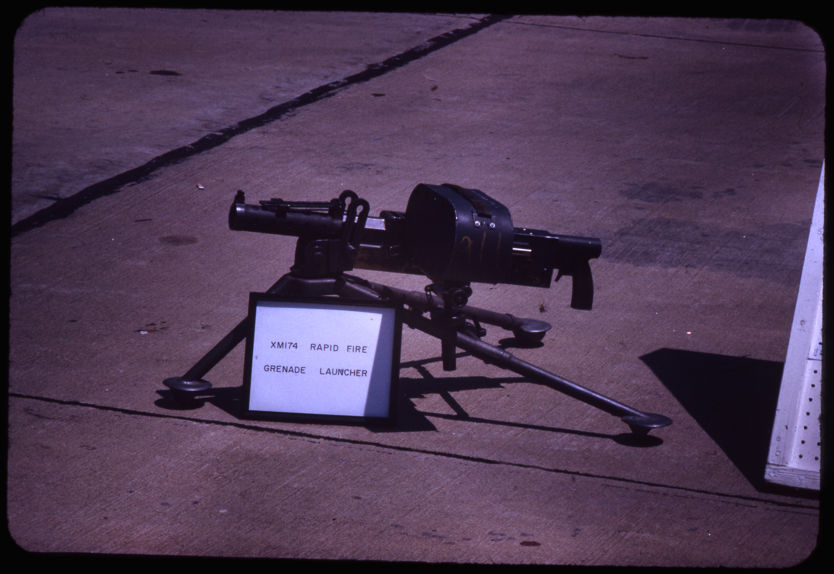
- Type: Automatic grenade launcher
- Place of origin: United States

Service history
- Used by: See users
- Wars: Vietnam War

Production history
- Designed: 1968
- Manufacturer: Aerojet Ordnance Manufacturing Company

Specifications
- Mass: 7.25 kg
- Length: 712 mm
- Cartridge: 40×46 mm
- Action: Simple blowback, closed bolt
- Rate of fire: 350 RPM
- Feed system: 12 round drum magazine
- Sights: Iron

The XM174 is a mounted automatic 40 mm grenade launcher heavily based on the M1919A4 machine gun and the M79 grenade launcher, but fed from an ammo can. It was used in the Vietnam War as a tripod mounted crew-served weapon and as a weapon mounted on various vehicles and aircraft. The XM174 has the same fire control group as the M1919A4.

The ammunition was held in a drum canister with a maximum capacity of twelve 40 mm rounds. The launcher was also capable of semi-automatic fire.

U.S. Air Force Security Police personnel in Vietnam were also issued the XM174 automatic grenade launcher which was often used on perimeter defense posts and heavy weapons vehicles.

== Users ==
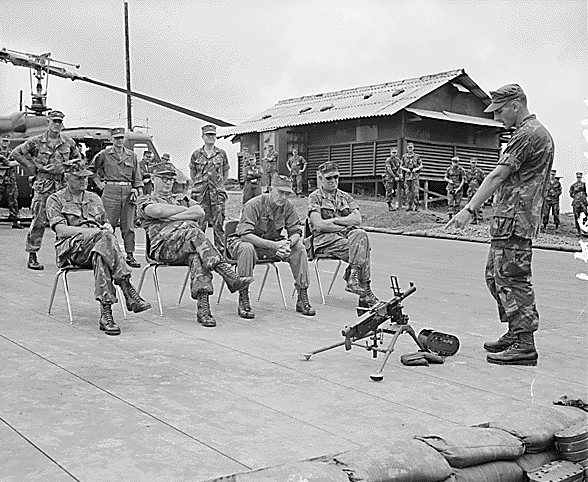

- United States - US Army, USMC, USAF

== See also ==
- Comparison of automatic grenade launchers
