= Defence industry of South Africa =

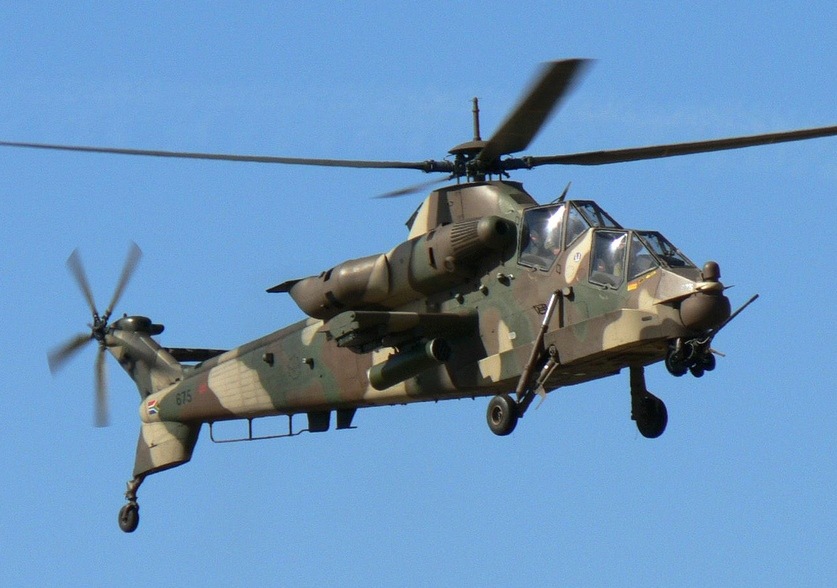
A South African-made Denel Rooivalk attack helicopter

The South African defence industry (SADI) is the continent's most advanced defence industrial base and one of South Africa's leading high-technology manufacturing sectors. It comprises more than 600 state-owned and private companies engaged in the research, development, manufacture and support of military equipment and defence technologies. The industry produces a wide range of military systems, including small arms and ammunition, armoured vehicles, artillery, missiles, military aircraft, naval vessels, electronic warfare equipment, military communications systems and unmanned systems. It supports the operational requirements of the South African National Defence Force (SANDF) while exporting defence products and technologies to more than 115 countries worldwide, including over 40 African markets.

The modern defence industry emerged during the Cold War, when international arms embargoes accelerated investment in domestic research, engineering and manufacturing. This led to the development of an extensive indigenous defence industrial base capable of designing, developing and producing sophisticated military systems locally. Today, South Africa is one of the few countries with the industrial and technological capability to design and manufacture advanced defence equipment across the land, air and maritime domains. The industry continues to play an important role in the country's economy through exports, advanced manufacturing, research and development, and high-skilled employment, while maintaining partnerships with governments, defence companies and armed forces around the world.

== History ==
=== Origins ===
South Africa's modern defence industry originated shortly before the Second World War with British support, when a limited domestic arms manufacturing capability was established to supply the country's military requirements. During the war, many civilian companies contributed to defence production, although most returned to civilian manufacturing after 1945. A small number of state-owned facilities, including Defence Ordnance (later Lyttelton Engineering Works) and the South African Mint Ammunition Factory, remained in operation. In 1951, the Defence Production Board was established to strengthen cooperation between the Department of Defence and private industry, laying the foundations for South Africa's modern defence industrial base.

=== Apartheid era ===
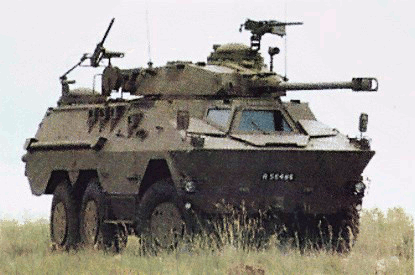
The Ratel IFV, introduced in 1976, was the world's first operational wheeled infantry fighting vehicle

The defence industry expanded rapidly during the 1960s as regional instability, growing internal unrest, the apartheid government's increasing international isolation, and the 1963 United Nations voluntary arms embargo encouraged South Africa to become increasingly self-reliant in defence production. Although the country continued importing military equipment from nations willing to circumvent the embargo, including France, Italy and Israel, greater emphasis was placed on expanding domestic research, engineering and manufacturing capabilities. Defence spending increased steadily throughout the decade, while the South African Defence Force (SADF) expanded significantly. By the late 1960s, close to 1,000 companies were involved in some aspect of defence production, ranging from research and development to component manufacturing and final assembly.

A major turning point came in 1968 with the establishment of Armscor through the merger of the Armaments Board and the Armaments Development Corporation. Armscor became responsible for defence procurement, research and industrial coordination, while acquiring and establishing several major defence companies and research facilities, including Atlas Aircraft Corporation, Kentron and the Institute for Maritime Technology.

The introduction of the mandatory United Nations arms embargo in 1977, together with South Africa's growing involvement in the Border War and conflicts in Angola and Namibia, accelerated the country's drive towards defence self-sufficiency. Armscor became the centre of the domestic defence industry, overseeing procurement, research, development and production, while thousands of private companies supplied components, specialised equipment and engineering support. The government's "Total Strategy" policy further expanded defence spending and strengthened cooperation between the state, the military and private industry.

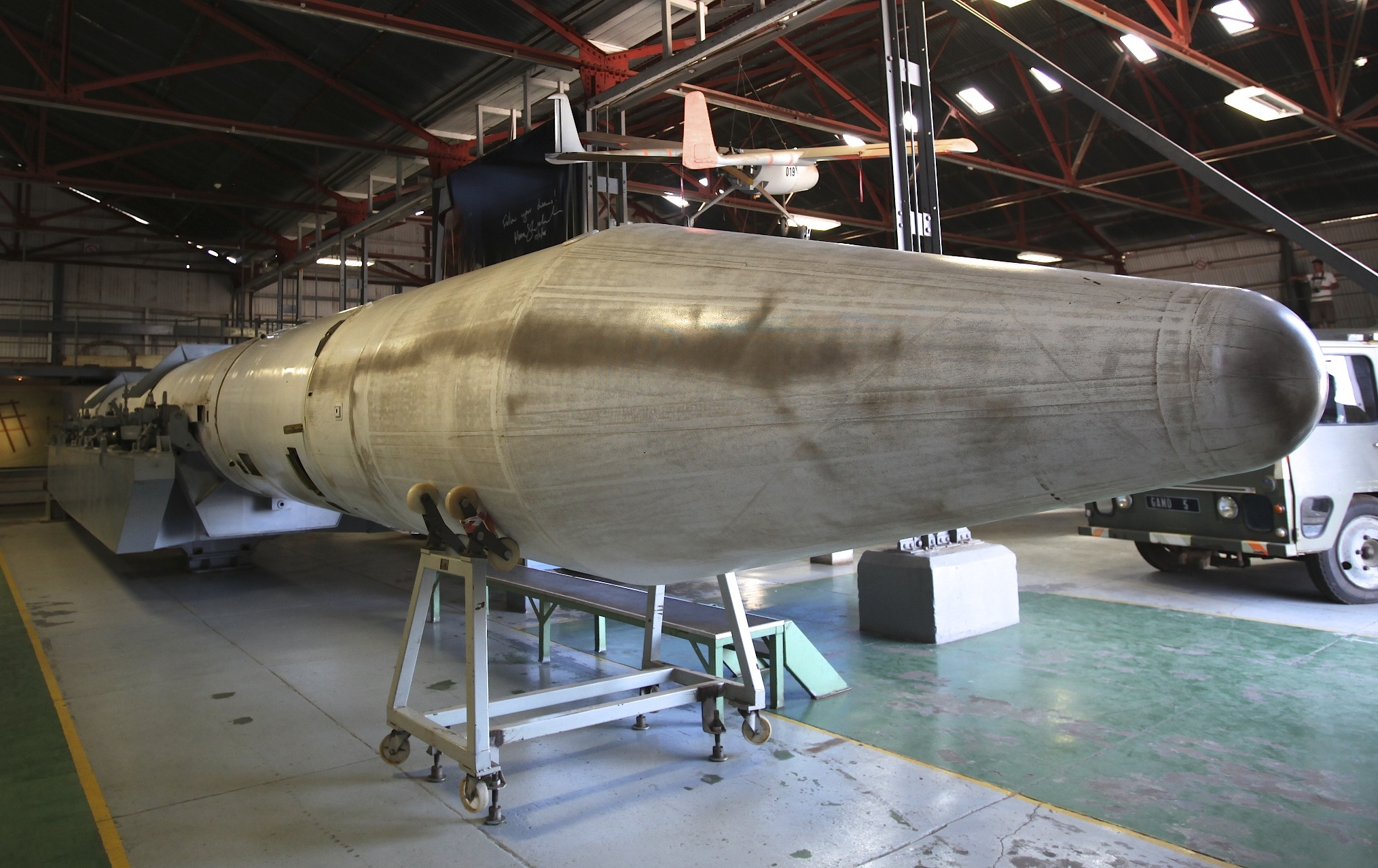
The RSA-3, a three-stage solid-fuel rocket developed under South Africa's space launch and ballistic missile programme, on display at the South African Air Force Museum

During this period, South Africa also pursued a clandestine weapons of mass destruction programme. Under Prime Minister John Vorster and later State President P. W. Botha, the country developed a nuclear weapons programme centred on the Pelindaba Nuclear Research Centre, with Armscor later assuming responsibility for the manufacture and assembly of the country's nuclear devices. As part of the programme, South Africa, in cooperation with Israel under a series of bilateral defence agreements, developed the RSA-1, RSA-2 and RSA-3 family of solid-fuel rockets, drawing extensively on Israeli missile technology associated with the Jericho programme. Although publicly presented as a civilian satellite launch initiative, the programme was closely linked to South Africa's strategic deterrent and was intended to provide the technological basis for long-range ballistic missile delivery systems capable of carrying nuclear warheads. The RSA-3 represented the most advanced stage of the programme, combining satellite launch capability with technology widely regarded as applicable to intermediate- and intercontinental-range ballistic missiles.

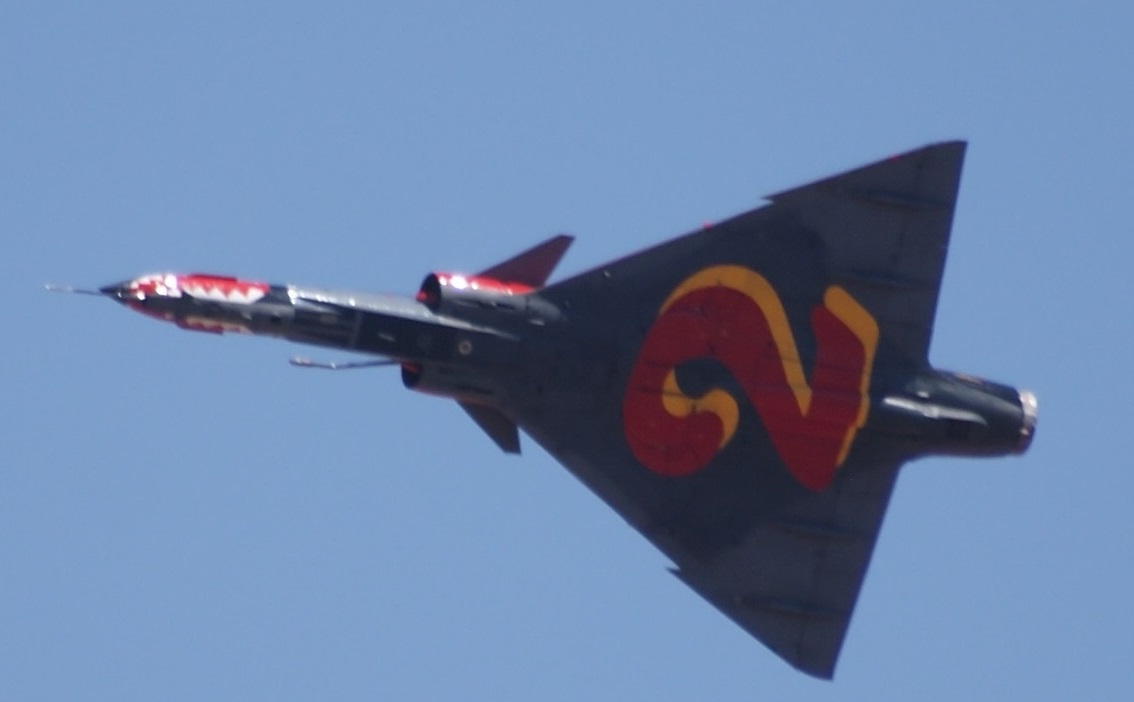
An Atlas Cheetah fighter aircraft in flight. Developed from the Dassault Mirage III with technology derived from the Israeli IAI Kfir, the Cheetah modernised the South African Air Force's fighter fleet despite the United Nations arms embargo.

In 1981, the SADF initiated Project Coast, a classified chemical and biological warfare programme directed by the Surgeon General of the SADF. Operating through a network of military laboratories and front companies, the programme formed the chemical and biological component of South Africa's broader strategic weapons programme during the final decade of apartheid.

By the late 1980s, South Africa had developed one of the largest and most technologically advanced defence industries outside the major military powers. Local companies designed and manufactured armoured vehicles, artillery systems, ammunition, communications and electronic warfare equipment, guided missiles and naval vessels, while Atlas Aircraft Corporation had established an indigenous aerospace industry capable of designing, assembling, upgrading and manufacturing military aircraft. Programmes such as the Atlas Cheetah fighter, the Atlas Oryx utility helicopter and the Rooivalk attack helicopter demonstrated the industry's growing technological sophistication. At its peak, Armscor employed more than 30,000 people, while the wider defence industry supported over 130,000 jobs across approximately 2,000 companies.

=== Post-apartheid ===
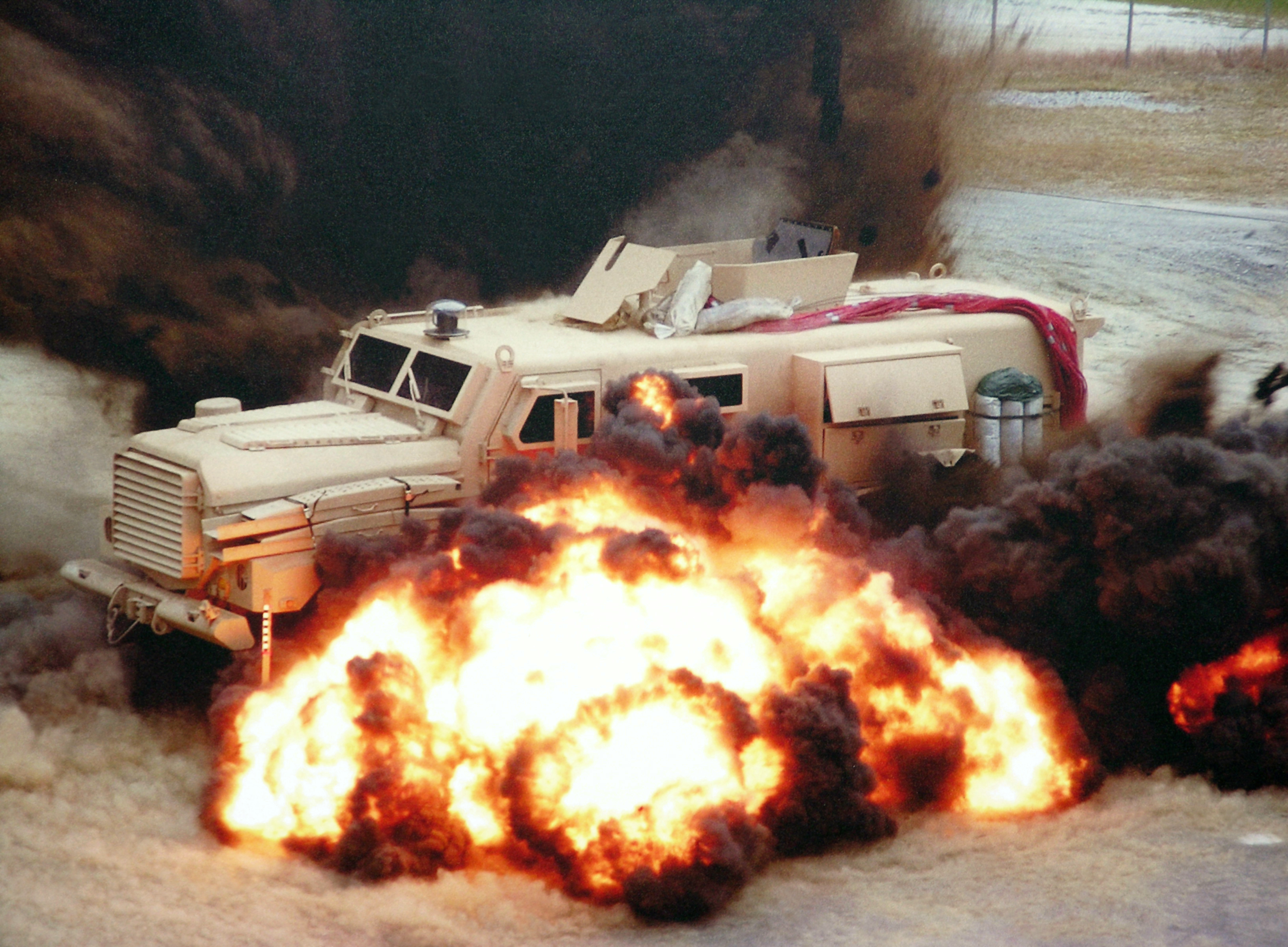
The Cougar HE mine-resistant ambush protected (MRAP) vehicle during testing. Its V-shaped hull was derived from South African mine-protected vehicle technology pioneered by the Casspir.

The end of apartheid and the Cold War fundamentally reshaped South Africa's defence industry. Defence spending declined sharply during the early 1990s as the new government shifted its priorities towards social and economic development. Production fell, many companies left the defence sector and thousands of skilled jobs were lost. In 1992, Denel was established to take over Armscor's manufacturing assets, while Armscor continued as the state's defence procurement agency. The transition to democracy also marked the end of South Africa's strategic weapons programmes. Between 1990 and 1995, the country's nuclear weapons were dismantled and Project Coast was discontinued as the apartheid-era security establishment was restructured. South Africa subsequently acceded to the Treaty on the Non-Proliferation of Nuclear Weapons (NPT), becoming the first state to voluntarily dismantle its entire nuclear weapons arsenal before placing its nuclear facilities under International Atomic Energy Agency (IAEA) safeguards.

The changing strategic environment and the lifting of international sanctions also resulted in the cancellation of several major indigenous defence programmes. In 1991, President F. W. de Klerk announced the cancellation of Project Carver, South Africa's indigenous fourth-generation, twin-engine multirole fighter aircraft programme intended to replace the South African Air Force's Cheetah fleet. Project Loggim, an initiative to develop a next-generation indigenous main battle tank for the South African Army, was also cancelled. Although development of the RSA rocket programme initially continued under the proposed GreenSat civilian satellite launch programme, it was terminated in 1994 following international non-proliferation pressure, particularly from the United States, and South Africa's efforts to join the Missile Technology Control Regime (MTCR). The United States and other Western governments remained concerned that the RSA-3 and proposed RSA-4 launch vehicles incorporated technologies directly applicable to long-range ballistic missiles, as civilian space launch vehicles and ballistic missiles share many of the same propulsion, staging and guidance systems and could be adapted to deliver weapons of mass destruction. Collectively, these developments marked a clear departure from the extensive self-reliance that had characterised South Africa's defence industry during the apartheid era, although the technological expertise developed during this period continued to underpin the country's modern defence industry.

Government policy subsequently shifted towards maintaining a smaller but internationally competitive defence industry. The 1999 White Paper on South African Defence Related Industries promoted exports, international partnerships and dual-use technologies while encouraging local companies to integrate into global supply chains and preserve critical sovereign industrial capabilities. As domestic procurement declined, exports became the primary source of revenue for much of the industry. During the 2000s and 2010s, South African defence companies increasingly focused on specialised technologies, particularly mine-resistant ambush protected (MRAP) vehicles, artillery systems, precision-guided weapons, electronic warfare systems and sensors. South African mine-protected vehicle designs, pioneered by platforms such as the Casspir and Mamba, influenced the development of mine-resistant vehicles worldwide, including those acquired by the United States and several NATO members for operations in Iraq and Afghanistan. The industry also expanded into emerging fields such as unmanned aerial vehicles (UAVs), unmanned ground vehicles (UGVs), autonomous systems and maritime security technologies, with more recent developments including unmanned surface vessels (USVs), while maintaining a strong export presence in international defence markets.

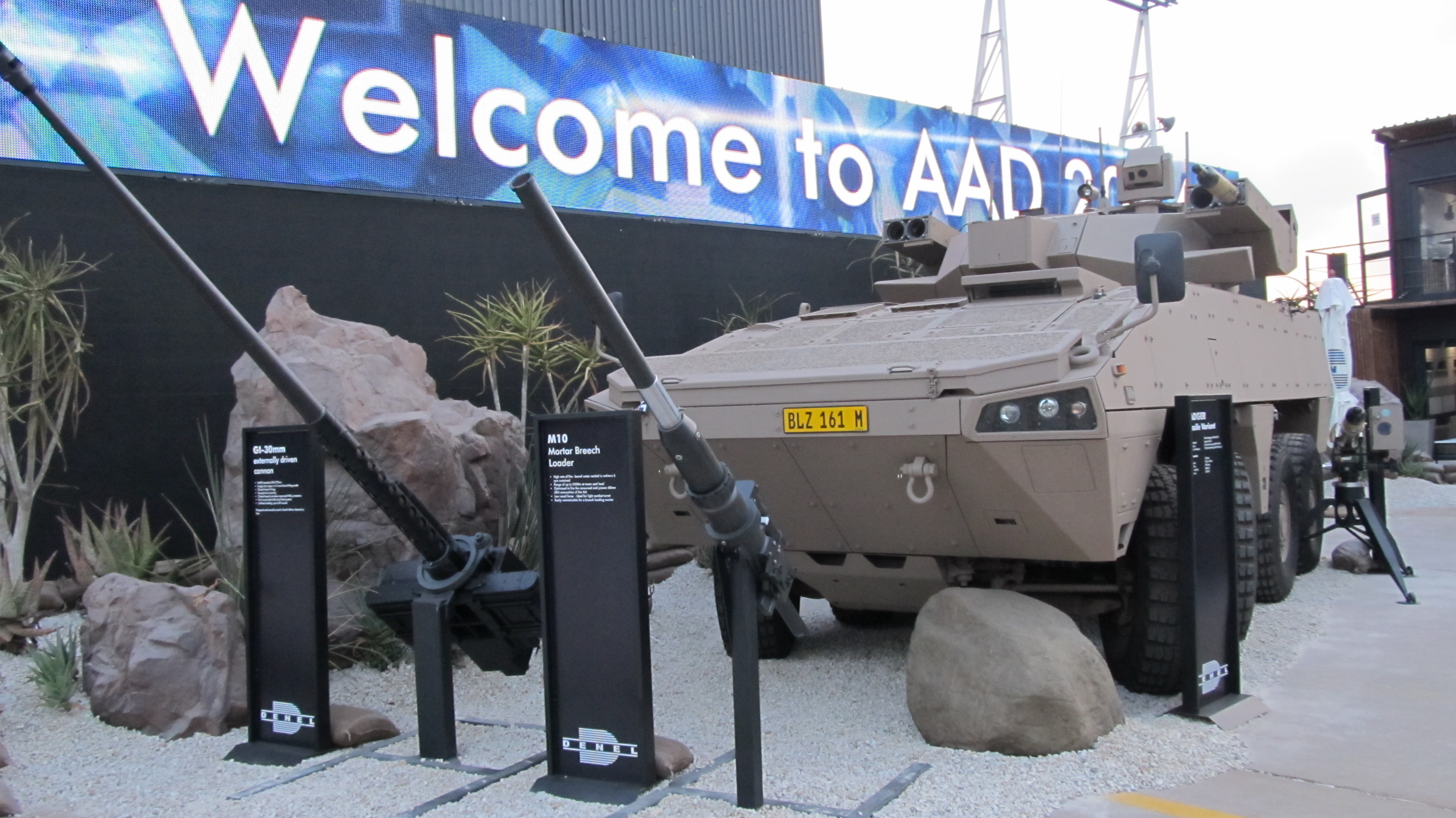
A Denel Land Systems Badger IFV exhibited at Africa Aerospace and Defence 2014

The 2015 Defence Review and the Defence Industry Strategy, approved in 2020, reaffirmed the industry's importance to technological innovation, exports, employment and national industrial capability. However, years of declining defence budgets, limited domestic procurement, financial difficulties at state-owned companies such as Denel, and increasing reliance on export markets have placed considerable pressure on the sector. Despite these challenges, South Africa retains significant expertise in artillery, missile systems, aerospace engineering, naval design, armoured vehicle technology, electro-optical systems, advanced defence electronics, and capabilities spanning the land, air, maritime, cyber and space domains. Government policy continues to prioritise preserving sovereign defence industrial capabilities through export promotion, international partnerships, investment in advanced technologies, and closer cooperation between government, industry and academia.

By 2026, the South African defence industry comprised more than 600 companies, approximately 250 private companies with a significant defence focus, and a further 350 suppliers supporting defence manufacturing and services. International defence companies such as Saab, Thales, Rheinmetall, HENSOLDT, Damen, Aselsan, Embraer, Airbus and Safran had established subsidiaries, partnerships or joint ventures in South Africa, reflecting confidence in the country's defence industrial capabilities. Cabinet also approved the Journey to Greatness thirty-year SANDF force modernisation strategy in May 2026, while the Department of Trade, Industry and Competition announced plans to strengthen the sector through a proposed Aerospace and Defence Special Economic Zone and increased industrial investment. Defence exports accounted for more than 80 per cent of total industry revenue, with South African defence products exported to more than 115 countries, including over 40 African markets. According to the Stockholm International Peace Research Institute (SIPRI), South Africa ranked 21st globally among exporters of major conventional arms during the 2018–2023 period, while the government stated in 2026 that the country had risen to 17th globally despite maintaining one of the world's smallest defence budgets among countries with a fully established defence industrial base.

== Companies ==
South Africa's defence industry comprises state-owned enterprises (SOEs), privately owned manufacturers and international subsidiaries involved in the development and production of military equipment, aerospace systems, naval vessels, munitions, electronics and advanced defence technologies. Together, these organisations support the operational requirements of the SANDF while supplying defence products and services to international customers.

=== Armscor (Armaments Corporation of South Africa) ===
Armscor is South Africa's state-owned defence acquisition, procurement and technology management agency. Established in 1968, it was originally responsible for both the development and manufacture of military equipment before its manufacturing assets were transferred to Denel in 1992. Today, Armscor manages defence acquisition on behalf of the Department of Defence and the SANDF, while overseeing research and development, testing and evaluation, quality assurance, and the management of strategic defence facilities.

=== Denel SOC Ltd ===
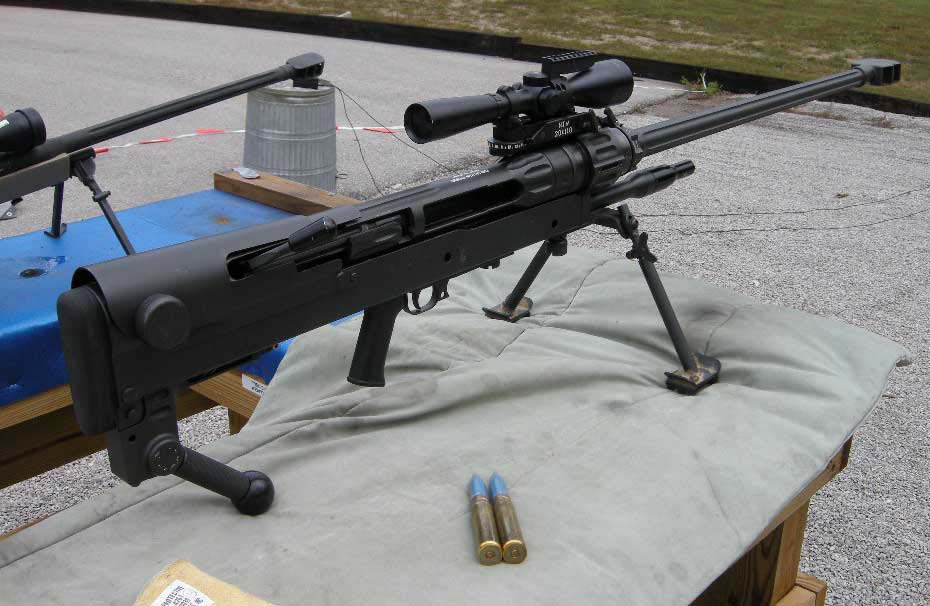
Denel NTW-20 anti-material rifle

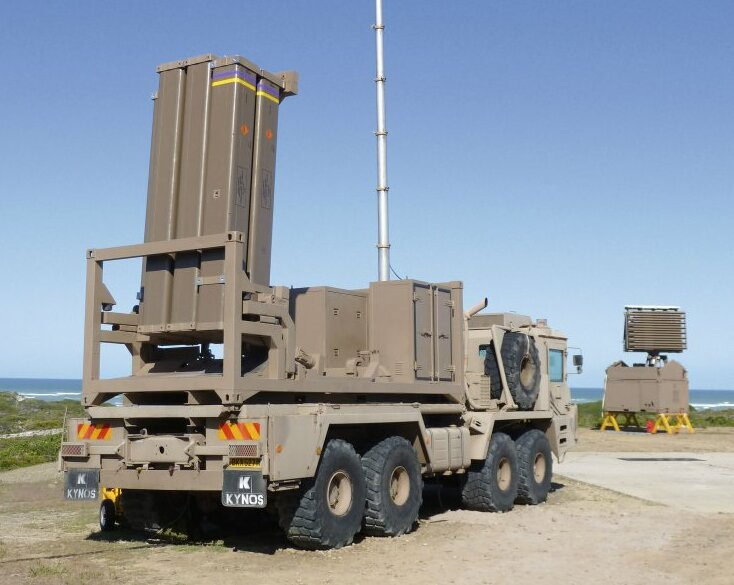
Umkhonto ground-based surface-to-air missile defence system

Denel is South Africa's principal state-owned defence and aerospace manufacturer. The company develops and manufactures military equipment across the land, air and maritime domains through several specialised divisions, with capabilities spanning missiles, artillery systems, armoured vehicles, aerospace engineering, ammunition and unmanned systems. Denel remains the largest defence manufacturer on the continent and serves both domestic and export markets.

Key divisions:

- Denel Dynamics
- Denel Land Systems
- Denel Aeronautics
- Pretoria Metal Pressings

Primary capabilities:

- Armoured vehicles
- Artillery systems
- Missiles and precision-guided weapons
- Military aircraft
- Unmanned systems
- Small arms and weapon systems
- Ammunition

=== Paramount Group ===
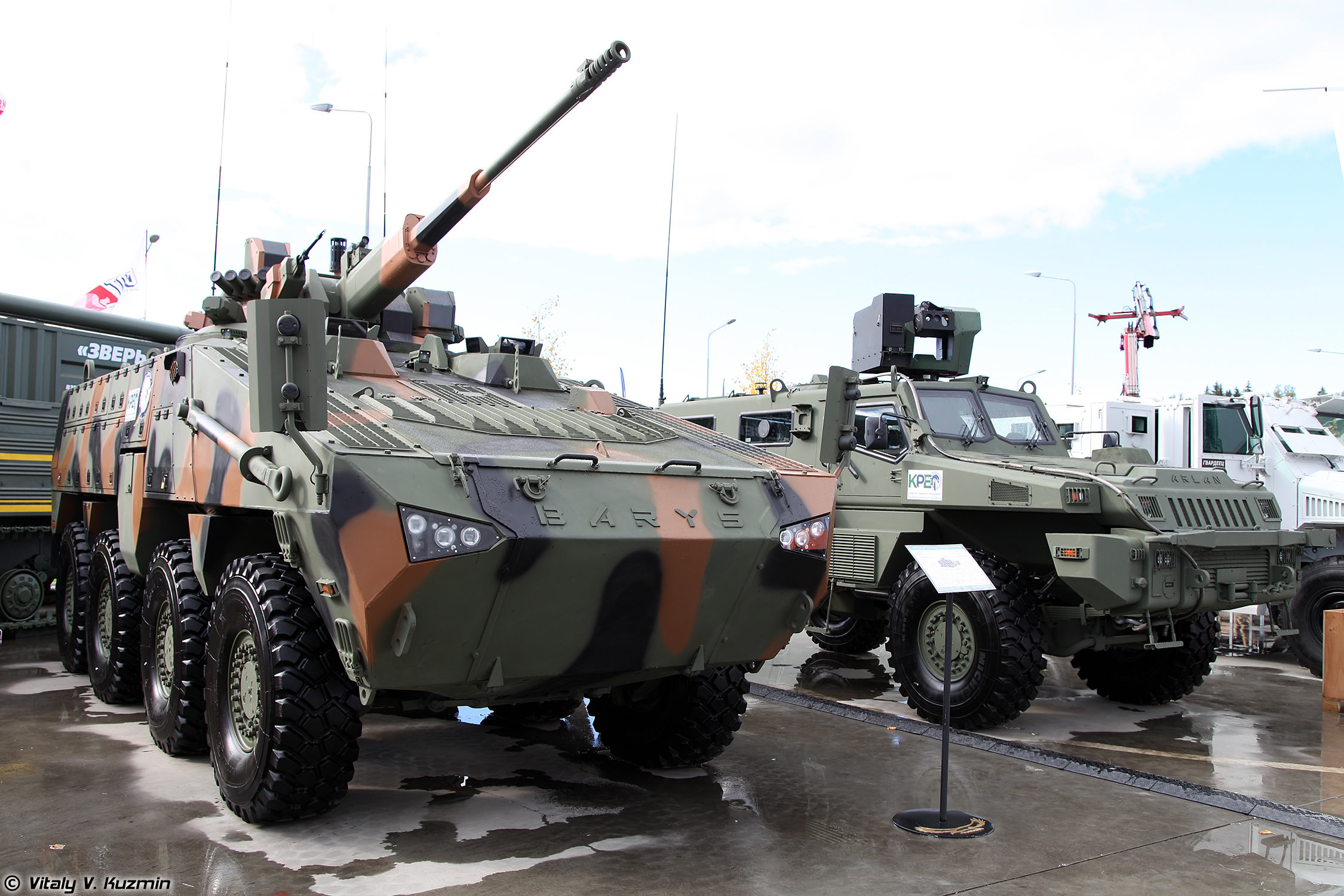
Paramount-designed Barys 8×8 and Marauder armoured vehicles on display at Kazakhstan Paramount Engineering.

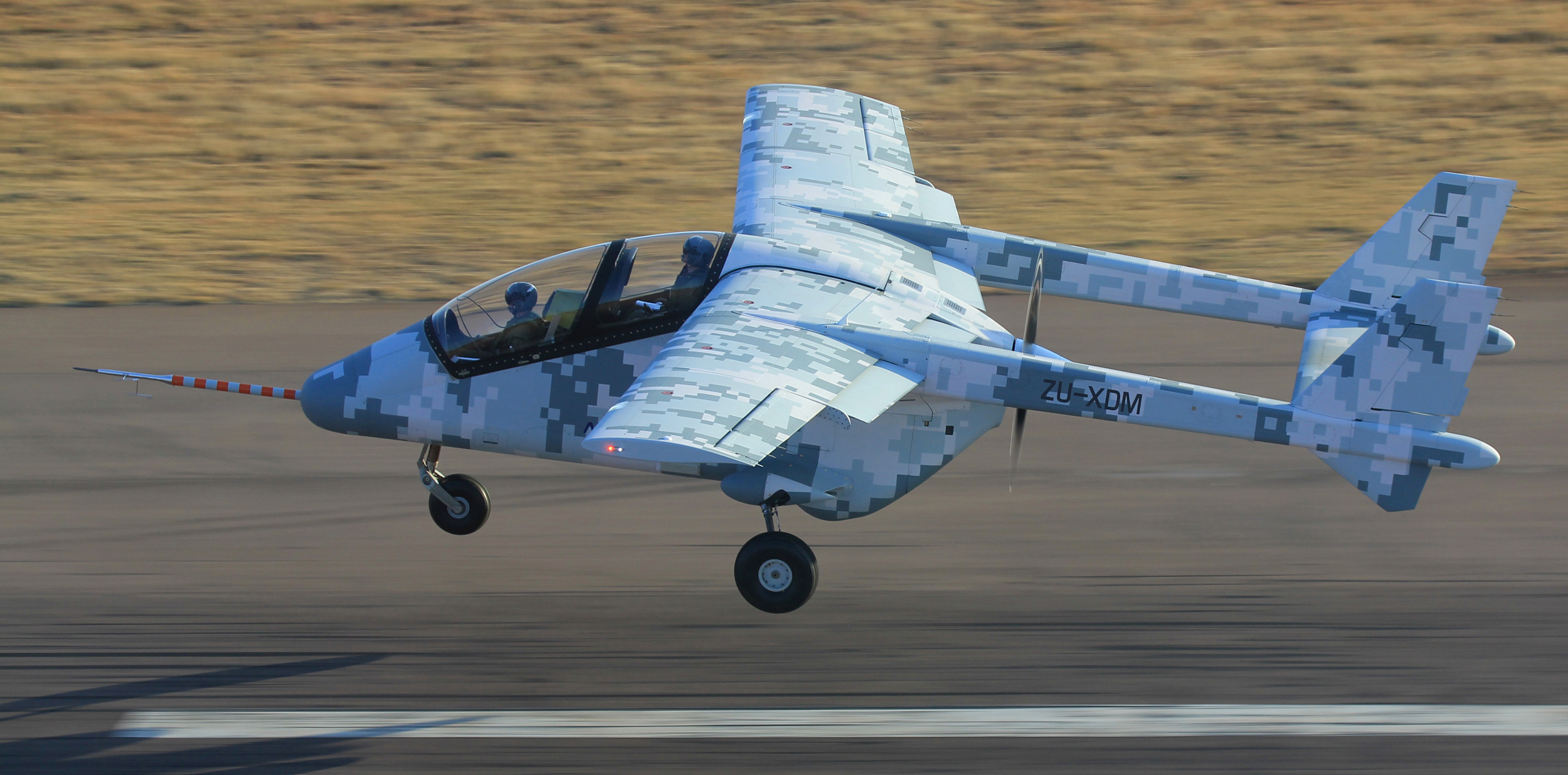
The Paramount Mwari, is a light reconnaissance and attack aircraft with intelligence, surveillance and counter-drone capabilities

Paramount Group is South Africa's largest privately owned defence and aerospace company and the continent's largest private defence manufacturer. The company specialises in the design, development and manufacture of armoured vehicles, aircraft, unmanned systems, defence electronics and integrated security solutions, with products exported to numerous countries.

Key divisions:

- Paramount Land Systems
- Paramount Aerospace Systems
- Paramount Naval Systems
- Paramount Mission Systems

Primary capabilities:

- Armoured vehicles
- Military aircraft
- Unmanned systems
- Defence electronics
- Military training systems

=== Milkor (Pty) Ltd ===
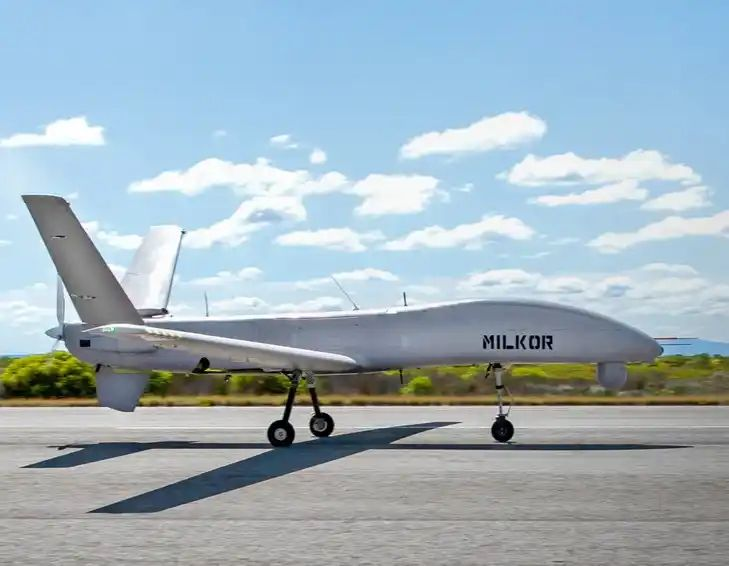
Milkor 380 unmanned combat aerial vehicle (UCAV)

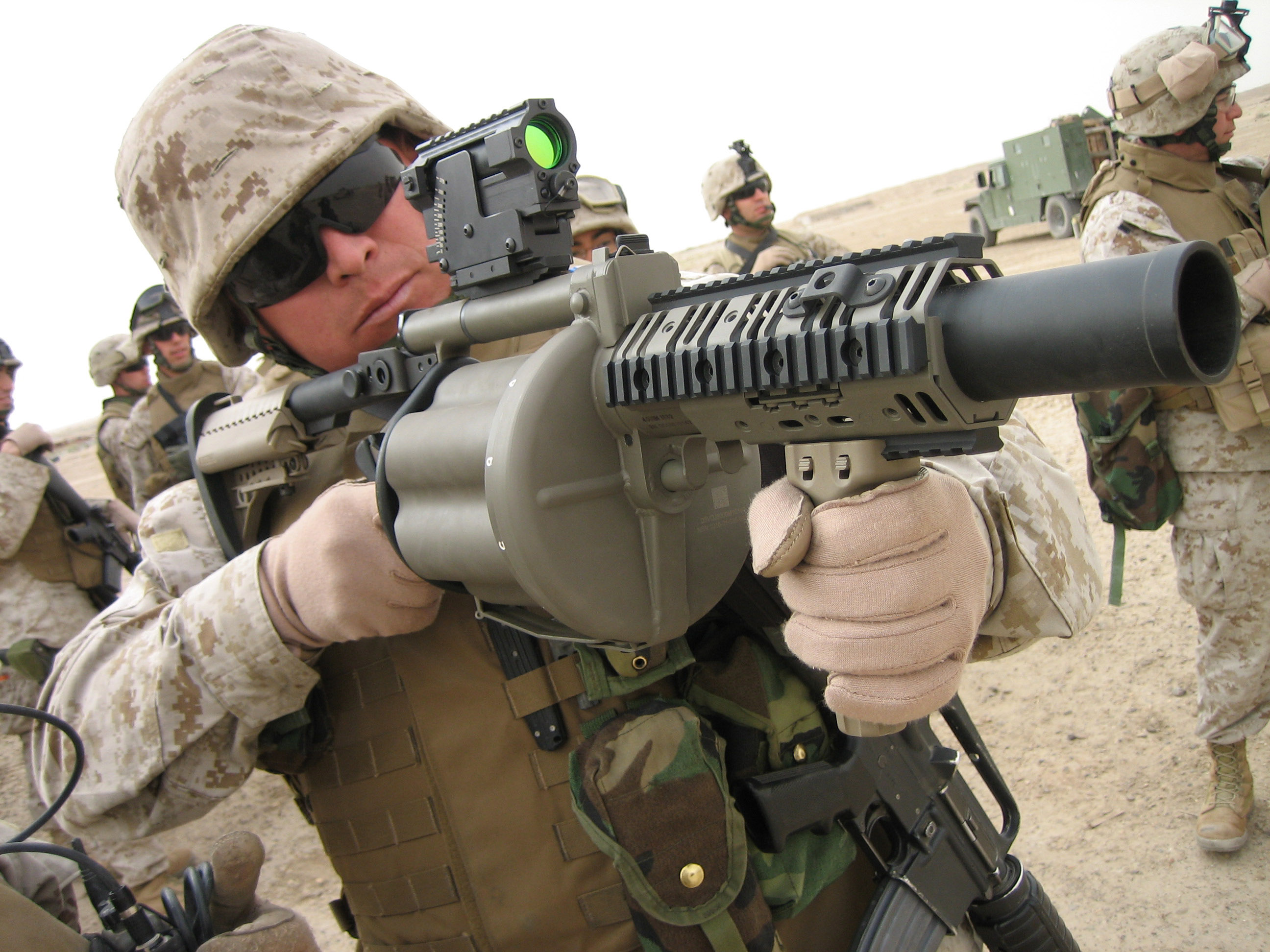
A Milkor MGL (M32 variant) in service with the United States Marine Corps

Milkor is a privately owned South African defence and aerospace company headquartered in Pretoria. Originally recognised for developing the Multiple Grenade Launcher (MGL), the company has since expanded into the design and manufacture of armoured vehicles, unmanned systems, naval platforms and aerospace technologies, becoming an important exporter of defence equipment.

Key divisions:

- Milkor Land Systems
- Milkor Air Systems
- Milkor Naval Systems
- Milkor Cyber Systems

Primary capabilities:

- Small arms and weapon systems
- Unmanned aerial systems
- Armoured vehicles
- Naval vessels
- Defence electronics

=== Rheinmetall Denel Munition ===
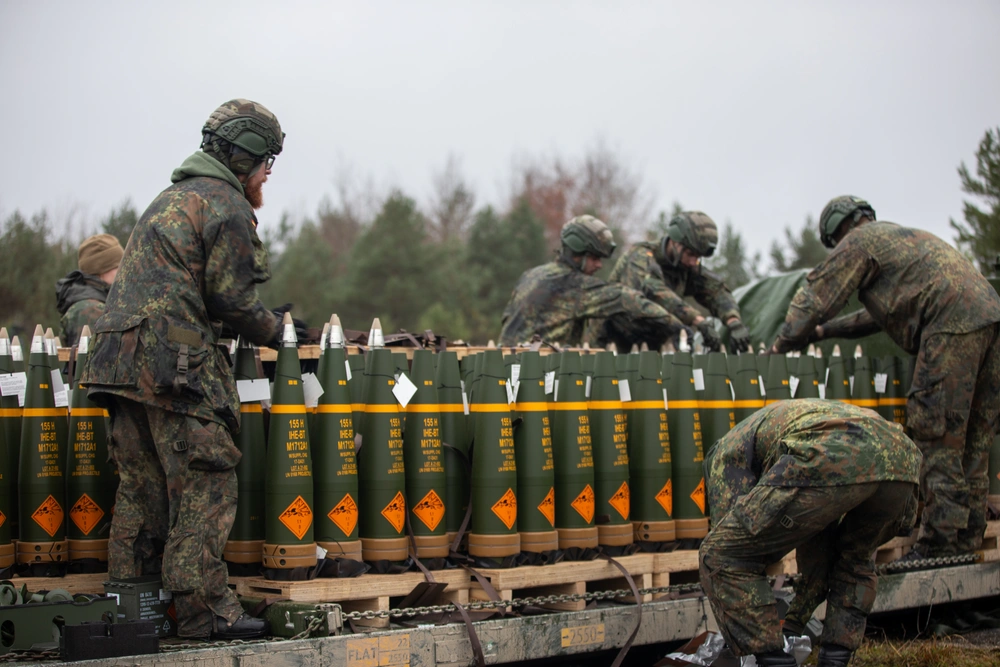
German Army personnel receiving M1712A1 artillery shells manufactured by Rheinmetall Denel Munition

Rheinmetall Denel Munition (RDM) is a joint venture between Denel and the German defence company Rheinmetall. Headquartered in Cape Town, the company is South Africa's largest manufacturer of military ammunition and energetic materials, and the continent's leading producer of large-calibre ammunition. It develops and manufactures a wide range of artillery, mortar, tank and infantry ammunition for both domestic use and export.

Primary capabilities:

- Large- and medium-caliber ammunition
- Infantry ammunition
- Energetic materials
- Propulsion systems
- Explosive ordnance

=== Other companies ===
In addition to the major organisations listed above, South Africa's defence industrial base includes hundreds of other manufacturers, suppliers and technology companies specialising in ammunition, aerospace engineering, armoured vehicles, defence electronics, communications, electro-optical systems, naval technologies, simulation and training, unmanned systems, and specialised military equipment. Notable companies include Saab Grintek Defence, HENSOLDT South Africa, Reutech Solutions, Sandock Austral, SVI Engineering, Truvelo Specialised Manufacturing, Damen Shipyards Cape Town, OTT Technologies, DCD Protected Mobility, and Rippel Effect, among many others. Together, these companies support the industry's larger prime contractors through component manufacturing, systems integration, research and development, maintenance, specialised engineering, and export-oriented production.

== See also ==
- Armscor
- South African National Defence Force
- Arms industry by country
