= Borys =

Borys is a given name and a surname, a spelling variant of "Boris" in some languages. Notable people with the name include:

== Given name ==
- Borys Baranets (born 1986), professional Ukrainian football midfielder who plays for FC Lviv in the Ukrainian Premier League
- Borys Bilash (born 1941), Ukrainian poet and politician
- Borys Buryak (born 1953), Ukrainian painter
- Borys Chambul (born 1953), retired discus thrower, who represented Canada at the 1976 Summer Olympics
- Borys Derkach (born 1964), retired Soviet and Ukrainian professional football player
- Borys Hrinchenko (1863–1910), classical Ukrainian prose writer, political activist, historian, publicist, ethnographer
- Borys Kolesnykov (born 1962), Ukrainian politician and 50th richest man in Ukraine
- Borys Kovtonyuk (1948–2025), Ukrainian journalist and local historian
- Borys Lankosz (born 1973), Polish film director
- Borys Lyatoshynsky (1895–1968), Ukrainian composer, conductor and teacher
- Borys Miturski (born 1989), Polish speedway rider who was a member of Poland U-21 national team
- Borys Mykolaiovych Martos (1879–1977), public and political activist, pedagogue, economist
- Borys Orlovskyi (born 1993), Ukrainian football midfielder
- Borys Paton (1918–2020), the long-term chairman of the National Academy of Sciences of Ukraine
- Borys Szyc (born 1978), Polish theatre and movie actor
- Borys Tarasyuk (born 1949), Ukrainian politician
- Borys Taschy (born 1993), professional Ukrainian football midfielder
- Borys Tereshchuk (1945–2011), Ukrainian former volleyball player who competed for the Soviet Union in the 1968 Summer Olympics
- Borys Wrzesnewskyj (born 1960), Canadian politician who represents the riding of Etobicoke Centre in the Canadian House of Commons

== Surname ==
- Andżelika Borys (born 1973), Polish activist in Belarus
- Karol Borys (born 2006), Polish footballer
- Stan Borys (born 1941), Polish singer-songwriter, actor, director and poet

== See also ==
- Barys, Belarusian variant
