= Barys (disambiguation) =

Barys is the Belarusian-language form of the given name Boris. It may refer to:

Barys may also refer to:

Derived from the Kazakh word Барыс, "snow leopard":

- HC Barys, professional ice hockey club based in Astana, Kazakhstan
- Barys Arena, Astana, Kazakhstan
- Order of Barys, Kazakhstan
- Aibek Barys, Kazakhstani entrepreneur

Other:

- Dorota Barys, Polish Hispanist and civil servant
- Łukasz Barys, Polish writer
- Mieczysław Barys (1896–1973), Polish military commander
- Stanisław Barys (1920–1982), Polish military commander
