= Boris (given name) =

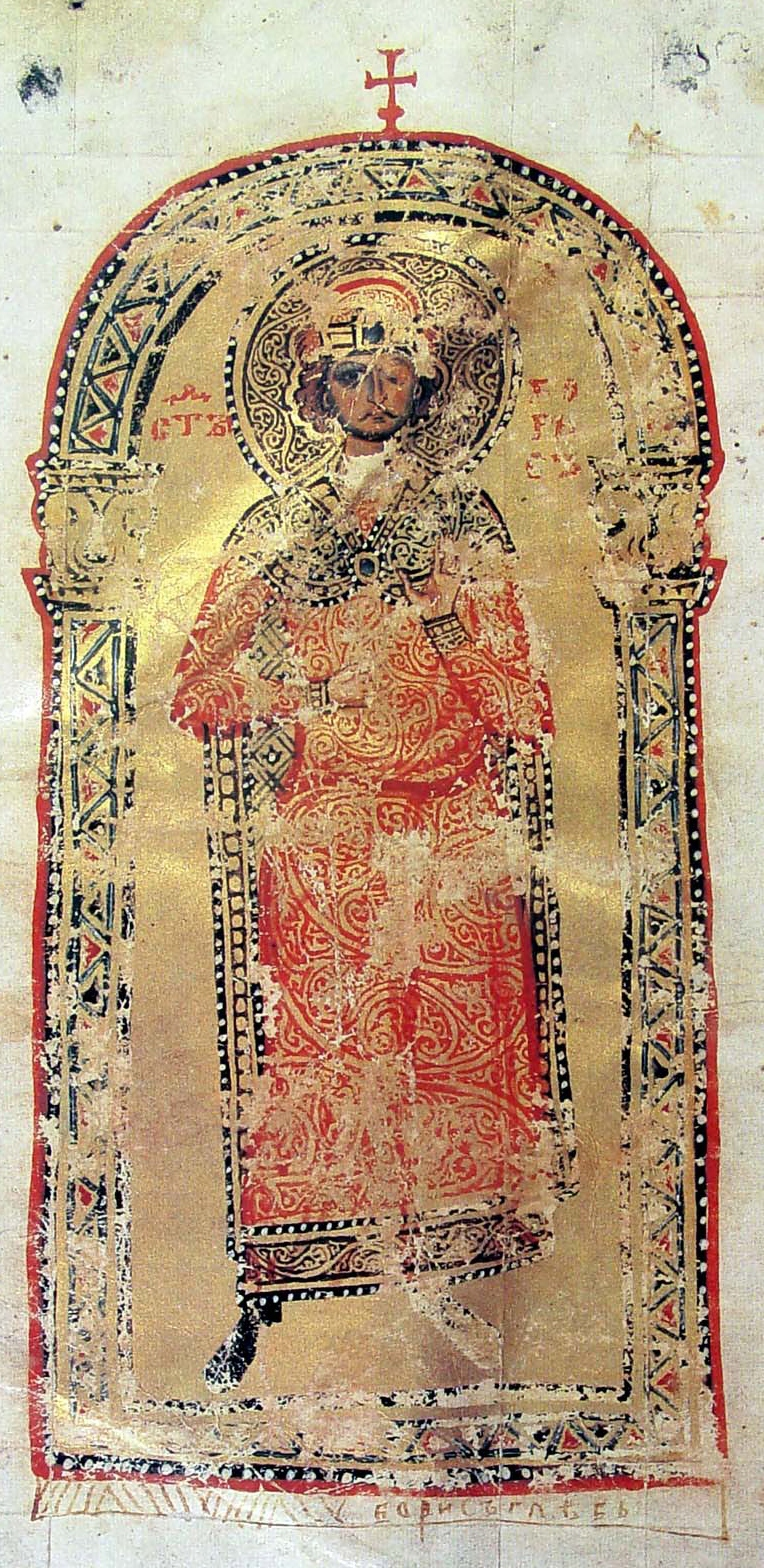
- Boris I of Bulgaria
- Gender: Male

Origin
- Origin: Bulgar, Bulgarian
- Meaning: Wolf, Short, Snow Leopard, Famous Battle (Borislav) or Fame-Bright (Robert)
- Region of origin: First Bulgarian Empire

Other names
- Related names: Bob, Bobby (nicknames)

Boris, Borys or Barys (Bulgarian, Russian, Serbian, Ukrainian: Борис; Belarusian: Барыс) is a male name of Bulgar origin. It is most commonly used in countries in Eastern Europe. (Note: These countries include: Russia, Ukraine, Belarus, Bosnia and Herzegovina, Bulgaria, Croatia, Montenegro, North Macedonia, Serbia, Slovakia, Slovenia.) It is also used in Greece and countries that speak Germanic, Baltic and Romance languages. The spelling variant Borys is more common in Poland.

== Early history ==
Early records of the name Boris are related to a ruler of the First Bulgarian Empire, Knyaz Boris I (r. 852–889). The name likely reached the Rus in the late 10th century, during the reign of Boris II of Bulgaria (r. 969–977), great-grandson of Boris I. In 967, the Byzantines instigated the Rus to attack the First Bulgarian Empire; it is probably around this military campaign that the marriage was arranged of Vladimir I of Kiev to a Bulgarian noblewoman, who is assumed to be a daughter of Peter I (i.e., sister of Boris II).

As evidenced by the Rus' Primary Chronicle, Boris and Gleb were sons of Vladimir I, born to him by the Bulgarian princess. During Vladimir's reign in 988, the conversion of the Kievan Rus' to Christianity took place. In this conversion, both ordinary priests and prelates from Bulgaria played a significant part. Also, with the adoption of the Byzantine calendar and the Eastern Orthodox liturgical calendar, the cult of St. Boris entered the Rus' Orthodox Church. In 1015, the princes Boris and Gleb were killed by their stepbrother Sviatopolk I of Kiev, who usurped the throne. Within a short time, Boris and Gleb were revered as native soldier-saints among the Ukrainians, Russians and Belarusians.

== Derivations ==
Borys is a Ukrainian and Polish-language variant, and Barys is a Belarusian-language variant.

The name gives rise to several patronymic surnames: Borisevich, Borysewicz, Barysevich, Borisevičius, Borisov, Borysenko (or Borisenko), Borysenkov (or Borisenkov), Borisik, Borysiuk (or Borisiuk), Borisikhin, Boriskin, Borisko, Borisovsky, Borysovych (or Borisovich), Borysiak (or Borisiak), Barysas.

A number of Jews in the Russian Empire and Soviet Union with the given names Baruch or Ber used the (unrelated) name "Boris" to avoid being targeted with antisemitism and, vice versa, upon immigration to Israel changed their name in the opposite direction. Some who did this were: Baruch Agadati, Baruch Podolsky, and Boris Schatz (Shlomo Zalman-Dov Baruch Boris Schatz). Accordingly, antisemites using the "Jew-counting" slander, applied the name "Barukh" to a public person called "Boris", so alleging the person to be a Jew and associating him with the "international Jewish conspiracy". This occurred, for example, to Boris Yeltsin, who was variously "revealed" to be "Baruch Eltzind", "Baruch Yeltzer", or "Baruch Elkin".

== See also ==
- List of people with given name Boris
