= Borisevich =

Borisevich is a Russian-language patronymic surname derived from the given name Boris. Notable people with the surname include:

- Kiprian Borisevich (1903–1980), Bishop of the Orthodox Church of America
- Nikolai Borisevich (1923–2015), Soviet-Belarusian physicist

== See also ==
- Barysevich, Belarusian counterpart
- Borysewicz, Polish counterpart
- Borisevičius, Lithuanian counterpart
