= Milkor 37/38mm and 40mm Stopper =

- Type: Grenade launcher
- Place of origin: South Africa

Service history
- In service: 1981–present
- Used by: South African Police Service

Production history
- Designer: Andries Piek
- Designed: 1981
- Manufacturer: Milkor (Pty) Ltd

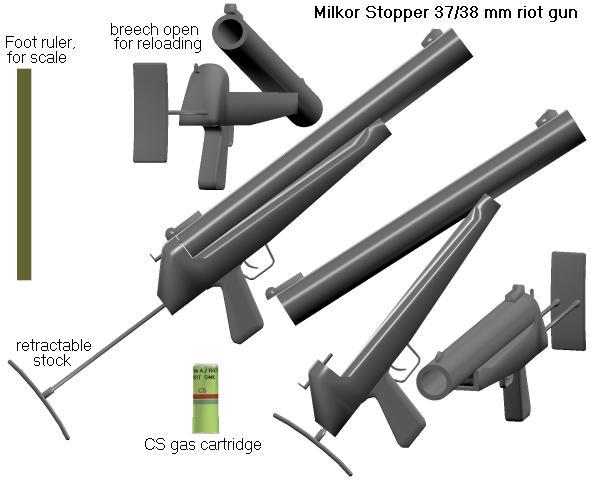
Four views of the 1981 37/38mm Milkor Stopper

The Milkor 37/38mm Less Lethal "Stopper" Single-shot was designed and distributed in 1981 by Milkor (Pty) Ltd as a less-lethal anti-riot weapon along with the Milkor 40mm Single shot Grenade Launcher which was designed as a reduced-cost grenade launcher for the SWAPOL Forces. In 2008, Milkor (Pty) Ltd released a new design designated the Milkor 37/38mm or 40mm Stopper Convertible, which is a single shot break-open weapon designed to utilize a variety of 37/38mm or 40mm Less Lethal rounds. As with the original Milkor MGL, the Stopper was originally marketed for Milkor by Armscor (South Africa).

== Context ==
The standard riot gun of the South African Police Service was the 37mm Federal Riot Gun. Owing to the arms embargo imposed upon the apartheid regime, it was difficult to obtain spare parts from the USA. Due to an international arms embargo against South Africa, South Africans designed and manufactured some weapons as a small firearms industry developed locally. A South African farmer, Andries Piek, the 'accidental designer' involved with the Milkor BXP was involved with the design of this weapon. This was to be the first in a product line of grenade launchers from Milkor (Pty) Ltd.

== Design ==
The Milkor Stopper is a riot gun used for riot control, designed to fire a 37/38mm or 40mm cartridge, which can be a 9mm Buckshot, Rubber ball buckshot, teargas canister, rubber shot cartridge or explosive. The weapon is simple to operate and all metal surfaces are treated with a coating for corrosion protection, plus long-life dry film lubrication. It fires one shot before reloading. It is a conventional single shot, break-open weapon (opening at the breech like an ordinary shotguns (not pump-action)) with a floating firing pin mechanism that ensures safety when accidentally dropped. As a security or assault weapon, it can be fired from the shoulder or like a pistol by hand. The components of the weapon are interchangeable (client dependent), providing a range of applications from Less Lethal 37/38mm to a 40mm Lethal weapon.

=== Variants ===
- (1981) The Milkor 37/38mm Less Lethal "Stopper" Single-shot
- (1981) The Milkor 40mm Single Shot Grenade Launcher
- (2008) The 37/38mm or 40mm Stopper Convertible

== See also ==
- HK69 grenade launcher
- Flash-ball
