= Borysenko =

Borysenko or Borisenko is a Ukrainian-language surname derived from the first name Boris. It may refer to:

- Andrei Borisenko
- Georgy Borisenko
- Pavlo Borysenko
- Valentina Borisenko
- Vladimir Borisenko
- Vyacheslav Borysenko
