= Barysevich =

Barysevich (Belarusian: Барысевіч) is a Belarusian-language patronymic surname derived from the given name Barys. It corresponds to Russian Borisevich (Борисевич), Polish Borysewicz, and Lithuanian Borisevičius.

- Anzhelika Barysevich
- Daryia Barysevich
- Katsiaryna Barysevich (born 1984), Belarusian journalist
