= Rippel Effect =

- Formerly: Milkor Marketing (1990s–2007)
- Type: Private
- Industry: Firearms; Marketing
- Founded: early 1990s
- Founders: Milkor (Pty) Ltd employees
- Headquarters: Pretoria, South Africa
- Products: Grenade launchers, Firearms
- Website: rippeleffect.co.za

Rippel Effect Weapon Systems Pty (Ltd) is a South African armaments manufacturer, which is known for marketing the Milkor MGL grenade launcher. Founded by employees of Milkor (Pty) Ltd in the 1990s to market Milkor products, the company was originally known as Milkor Marketing but was renamed as Rippel Effect in 2007. The decision to change the name was made to avoid confusion from Milkor (Pty) Ltd and start marketing their own products. Rippel Effect Weapon Systems manufactures and markets the XRGL40 multishot grenade launcher, a fourth generation launcher designed in 2007 by the Rippel Effect Development Team. Rippel Effect Weapon Systems is based in Pretoria, South Africa.

Milkor USA is an independent company that markets their own launcher, the M32 to the American Armed forces and other countries. the M32 is based on the MSGL40-140, but has been developed into a distinct launcher.

Milkor (Pty) Ltd is an independent company that has been manufacturing the MGL since the 80's. They have a range of launchers. Milkor (Pty) Ltd has no affiliation with Rippel Effect or Milkor USA.
