= Podvirne =

Commune in Chernivtsi Oblast, Ukraine

Coordinates: 48°17′51″N 26°37′17″E

Podvirne (Ukrainian: Подвірне; Romanian: Chișla-Salieva) is a village in Dniester Raion, Chernivtsi Oblast, Ukraine. It belongs to Mamalyha rural hromada, one of the hromadas of Ukraine.

Until 18 July 2020, Podvirne belonged to Novoselytsia Raion. The raion was abolished in July 2020 as part of the administrative reform of Ukraine, which reduced the number of raions of Chernivtsi Oblast to three. The area of Novoselytsia Raion was split between Chernivtsi and Dniester Raions, with Podvirne being transferred to Dniester Raion.

== Notable people ==
- Borys Buryak (born 1953), painter
