= Borysiuk =

Borysiuk is a surname. Notable people with the surname include:

- Ariel Borysiuk (born 1991), Polish footballer
- Bolesław Borysiuk (born 1948), Polish politician
