= Milkor =

South African arms company

Milkor (Pty) Ltd
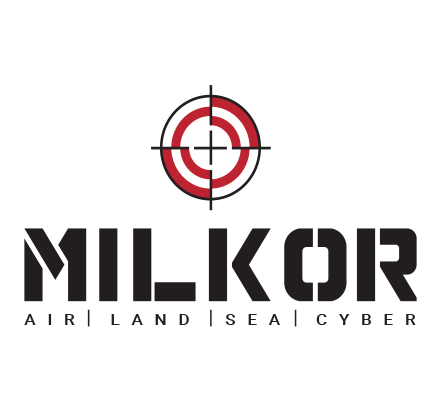
- Type: Proprietary company
- Industry: Arms industry Aerospace Drones
- Founded: 1981; 45 years ago
- Founder: Andries C. Piek
- Headquarters: Hennopspark, Centurion, Gauteng, South Africa
- Area served: worldwide
- Key people: Armand Bodenstein (Director of Business Development) MC De Beer (CEO) Julian Coetzee (CEO)
- Products: Unmanned Systems, Grenade launchers, Firearms, Accessories
- Number of employees: 450+
- Website: milkor.com

Milkor (Pty) Ltd is a privately owned South African company established in 1980. The company is best known for the range of Milkor MGLs 40mm (multiple grenade launcher), used in more than 50 countries. Since 2017 Milkor has expanded their capabilities to include Land, Air and Sea and Cyber.

Milkor also has an array of 37/38mm and 40mm products catering to the less-lethal market, for infantry and for special forces applications.

== Products ==
The company's weapon product line-up includes:

- Milkor 380
- Milkor 40mm UBGL grenade launcher
- Milkor 37/38mm and 40mm Stopper Convertible
- Milkor 37/38mm Pistol
- Milkor 40mm MGL Mk 1S
- Milkor 40mm MGL Mk 1L
- Milkor 37/38mm MAR (Multiple Anti-Riot)
- Milkor 40mm SuperSix MRGL
- 37/38 and 40mm Accessories

The company used to manufacture a submachine gun, the Milkor 9mm BXP.

== Product copies ==
The US M32 multi-shot grenade launcher, which is in official use by US Marine Corps, is based on the original Milkor MGL-140 design, but with various minor modifications by Milkor USA, which is an entirely different business entity from the original Milkor (Pty) Ltd, based in South Africa. Other copies and clones of the original Milkor MGL weapon are manufactured in Bulgaria by Arsenal Inc as Arsenal MSGL, in Croatia by Madlerd Ltd. (previously IM Metallic d.o.o.) as RBG-6, and in South Africa by Rippel Effect (formerly Milkor Marketing).
