= Kazakhstan Paramount Engineering =

Kazakhstan armored vehicle manufacturer

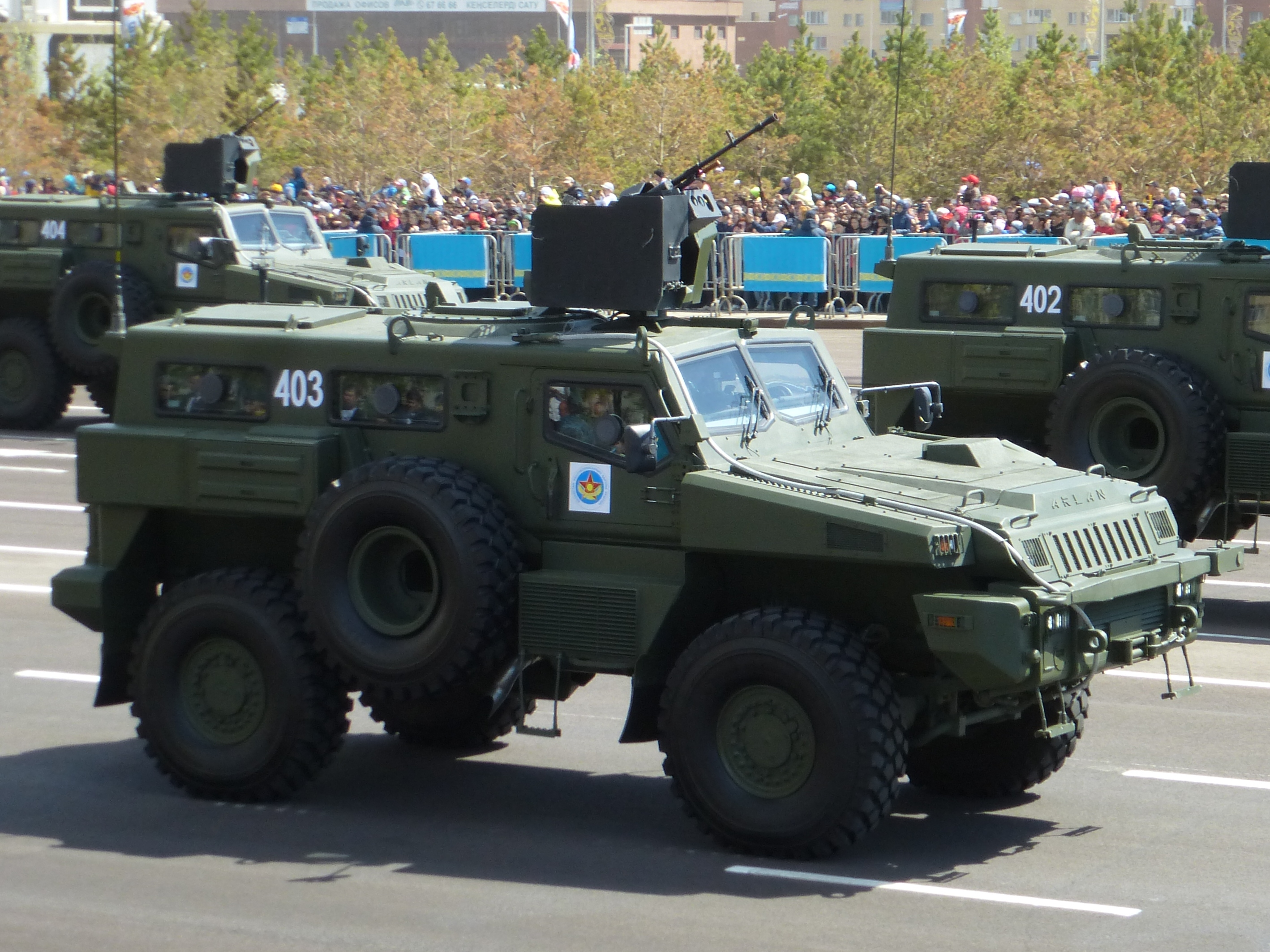
- Native name: Kazakh: «Қазақстан Парамаунт Инжиниринг» ЖШС; Russian: ТОО «Казахстан Парамаунт Инжиниринг»
- Type: Private
- Industry: defense
- Founded: June 2, 2014; 12 years ago
- Founder: Aibek Barys
- Headquarters: Astana, Kazakhstan
- Area served: Central Asia
- Products: Munitions, Small arms, Artillery, Explosives, Combat vehicle, Warship, Electro-optical devices
- Website: https://kpe.com.kz/

Kazakhstan Paramount Engineering (KPE) (Kazakh: Қазақстан Парамаунт Инжиниринг, Qazaqstan Paramaunt İnjiniring) is a Kazakhstan-based manufacturer of wheeled armored vehicles. The company was established in 2014 as part of a joint venture between Kazakhstani and South African companies. The primary focus of KPE is the production and modernization of Mine-Resistant Ambush Protected (MRAP) vehicles. The company produces armored vehicles for domestic use and exports them in limited quantities.

== Activities ==
KPE specializes in the development and assembly of wheeled armored vehicles and various types of military equipment. The company asserts its capability to operate in the climatic and geographical conditions of Kazakhstan. Since 2022, in collaboration with Turkey, KPE has been working on projects aimed at creating integrated communication and protection systems for armored vehicles.

KPE has obtained the rights to manufacture several armored vehicle models, including the "Arlan," whose design has been modified to suit specific needs.

In 2024, KPE has partnered with Singapore-based ST Engineering to set up production capability for a new 8×8 amphibious multi-purpose armored vehicle in Kazakhstan.

== Criticism ==
A widely discussed conflict between KPE and the Ministry of Defense of Kazakhstan emerged in the KazNet. The manufacturer emphasized the importance of local production to strengthen national defense capabilities and economic potential. Meanwhile, the Ministry stressed the need for strict adherence to testing and procurement procedures, as well as a careful comparison of price and quality with foreign counterparts. Additionally, KPE faced accusations of failing to fulfill a state defense contract.

In 2023, the conflict was resolved, and starting in 2024, Kazakhstan’s Ministry of Defense began signing contracts with KPE for the supply of the factory’s products, including Arlan 4x4 and Barys 8x8 vehicles.

KPE's armored vehicles were used during combat operations in Mariupol amid the Russian invasion of Ukraine. According to the manufacturer, the only delivery was made in 2019 to the National Guard of Russia in a basic configuration without weapons for testing purposes.

These vehicles were also deployed by the government to maintain order during protests in Almaty, Kazakhstan, in 2022.
