= Aibek Barys =

Kazakh entrepreneur and businessman (born 1987)

- Born: 30 March 1977 (age 49); East Kazakhstan
- Citizenship: Kazakhstan
- Education: Narxoz University
- Occupation: Founder of Kazakhstan Paramount Engineering
- Parent: Aidar Baryssov (father) Aiman Baryssova (mother)
- Website: barysov.kz

Aibek Barys (Kazakh: Айбек Айдарұлы Барыс; born March 30, 1977, in Kuanysh village, East Kazakhstan Region, Kazakh SSR, USSR) is a Kazakhstani entrepreneur. He is founder of Astana-based Kazakhstan Paramount Engineering

== Biography ==
Aibek Barys graduated from high school in Zaysan and completed his studies at the Kazakh State Academy of Management now known as Narxoz in 1998.

In 2014, Barys founded a company specializing in the production of armored vehicles at one of his enterprises. As the chairman of the supervisory board, he oversees the development and manufacturing of these vehicles.

In 2018, he established a company focused on automated fire control systems. The company develops technologies designed to improve the effectiveness of defensive and offensive operations.

In 2020, Barys initiated the creation of an association of defense enterprises in Kazakhstan, where he was elected chairman.

In 2022, he was involved in collaboration with Turkey and announced a transition to NATO standards.

In 2024, Barys announced a strategic partnership with Singapore.

He participates in the activities of the defense-industrial complex, regularly speaking at conferences and forums on industry modernization. According to Barys, his projects focus on localizing production in Kazakhstan to enhance the country's national security.

== Criticism ==
In the spring of 2022, media outlets published photos of the "Arlan" armored vehicle being used in Mariupol, Ukraine. An investigation confirmed the authenticity of the images. Barys explained that the vehicle was delivered to Russia in 2019 for field testing in compliance with international and domestic export regulations. He stated that further cooperation with Russian authorities had been discontinued.

A widely discussed issue involved Barys’s son, who was exempted from military service due to a medical condition — a brain cyst. Despite public criticism, the family stated their willingness to reconsider the exemption if the son's health improved.

Barys, as a key figure in the defense industry and the owner of Kazakhstan Paramount Engineering, was involved in a conflict between the company and the Ministry of Defense of Kazakhstan.
