= Vladimir Borisenko =

Ukrainian singer (born 1992)

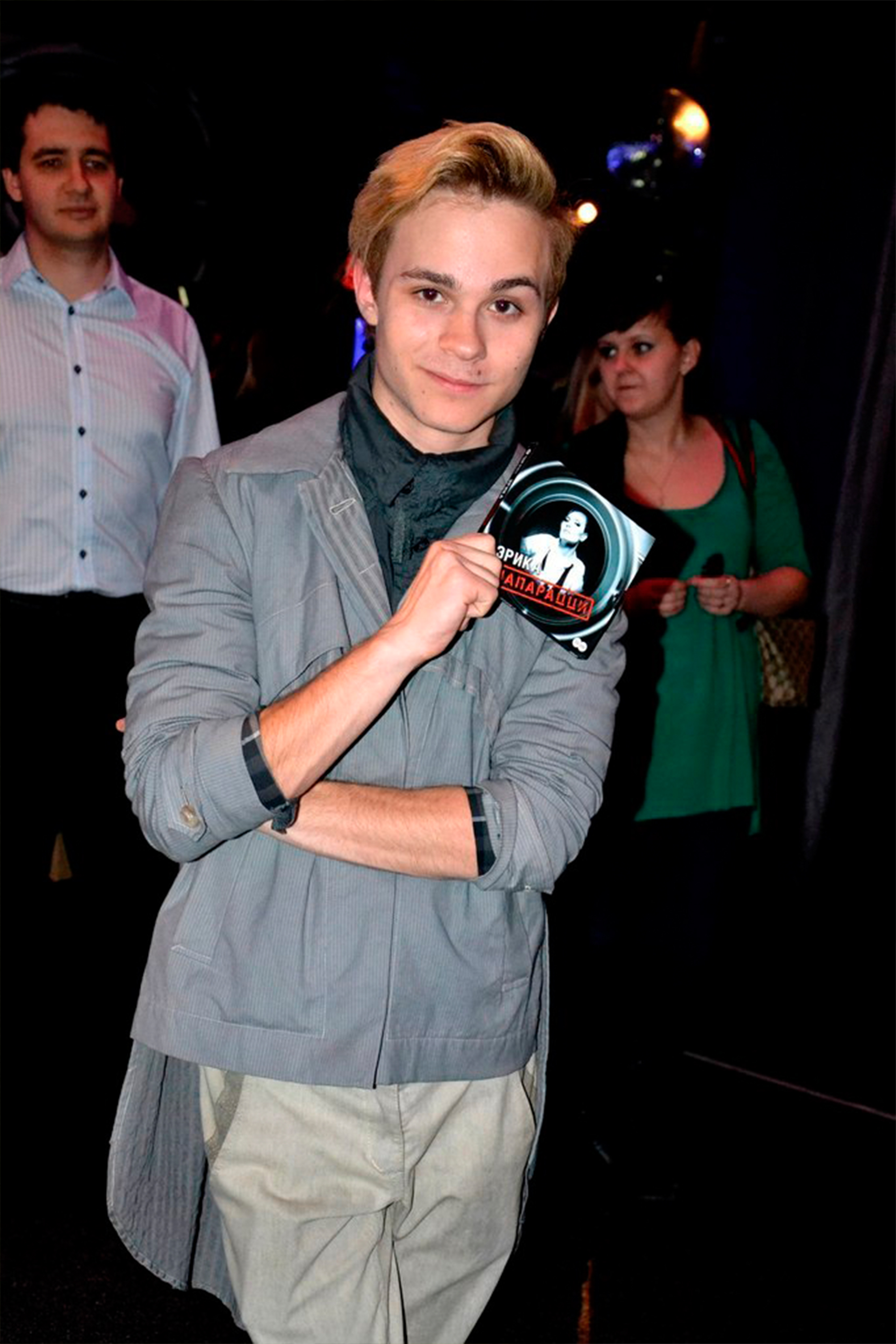
- (2012) Vladimir in the presentation of Erica's debut album "Paparazzi".

Background information
- Birth name: Vladimir Andreyevich Borisenko
- Born: 8 September 1992 (age 32); Dnipropetrovsk, Ukraine
- Origin: Ukraine
- Genres: Pop, electropop, disco, synth-pop
- Occupations: singer; songwriter; actor; musician
- Instrument: Piano
- Years active: 2006–present

Vladimir Andreyevich Borisenko (Ukrainian: Борисенко Володимир Андрійович born 8 September 1992), is a Ukrainian singer. He is a member of Fabrika Zirok (Star Factory-3) and Ukrayina maye talant (Ukraine's Got Talent)projects.

== Biography ==
Vladimir is better known by the alternative spelling of Vova. He is best known for being a member of the boyband Borisenko Brothers, along with his twin brother Alexander Borisenko. They took part in the first season of the show Ukrayina maye talant. Later, in autumn 2009, they participated in the Fabrika Zirok|. They obtained fourth place from the result of audience, behind Serzi Nicholas, Alex Mathias and Stas Shurins.

== Borisenko Brothers discography ==
=== Songs ===
- "Zvezdnyj Bereg"
- "Pust'ya Malen'kogo Rosta"
- "Koldovala Zima"
- "Ya Geroj"
- "Lyubov's pervogo vzgljada"
- "Ona"
- "Nebo plachet"
- "Mama"
- "Stop"
- "Ne Trogay Moy Pleer"
- "Ya Prosto Schastliv"
- "Na miliony odna"

=== Singles ===
- 2009 "Ne Trogay Moy Pleer»
- 2011 "Pust'ya Malen'kogo Rosta»
- 2010 "Koldovala Zima»
- 2011 "Мама"
- 2011 "Lyubov' s pervogo vzgljada"
- 2012 "Ya Prosto Schastliv"
- 2012 "Nu Chto Tu Hochesh?"

=== Videos ===
- 2010 Koldovala Zima
- 2011 Ljubov S Pervogo
- 2012 Ya Prosto Schastliv
- 2012 Nu Chto Tu Hochesh?
