= Nikolai Borisevich =

Soviet-Belarusian physicist (1923–2015)

- Мікалай Барысевіч
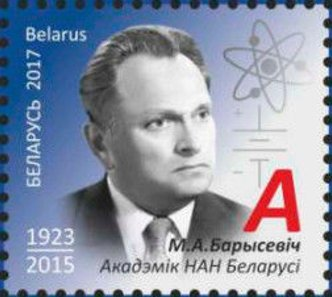
- Borisevich on a 2017 stamp of Belarus
- Born: 21 September 1923; Lučny Most, Byelorussian SSR, Soviet Union (now Belarus)
- Died: 25 October 2015 (aged 92); Minsk, Belarus
- Education: Belarusian State University; Vavilov State Optical Institute
- Scientific career
- Fields: Quantum optics; Spectroscopy; Molecular physics

Nikolai Aleksandrovich Borisevich (Note: Belarusian: Мікалай Аляксандравіч Барысевіч, romanized: Mikalaj Aliaksandravič Barysievič Russian: Никола́й Алекса́ндрович Борисе́вич) (21 September 1923 – 25 October 2015) was a Soviet and Belarusian physicist and public figure. Borisevich is best known for his 1955 discovery of the stabilization and labilization phenomenon of electronically excited polyatomic molecules, but also developed the first optical filters to demonstrate infrared radiation.

== Early life and academic career ==
Nikolai Aleksandrovich Borisevich was born on 21 September 1923 into a peasant family in the village of Lučny Most, in the Minsk Region of what was then the Byelorussian Soviet Socialist Republic within the Soviet Union. During World War II, he served in the Belarusian partisans before later joining the Red Army and serving as an artillery officer at the Battle of Berlin.

Following the end of the war, Borisevich went to the Belarusian State University, graduating from the university's faculty of physics and mathematics in 1950. He subsequently completed his post-graduate studies at the Vavilov State Optical Institute, defending his thesis in 1954. Afterwards, he left for Minsk, where he helped to found the B. I. Stepanov Institute of Physics at the National Academy of Sciences of Belarus. From 1954 to 1963, he also worked as an associate professor at the Belarusian State University.

In 1969, Borisevich was appointed as president of the National Academy of Sciences of Belarus. He held the position for 18 years, until 1987, and oversaw a high point of Belarusian activity in the sciences. From 1984 to 1989, he also served as a member of the Supreme Soviet of the Soviet Union, where he became a supporter of the faction in opposition to Mikhail Gorbachev's reforms.

== Scientific activity ==
Borisevich was active in several fields of molecular physics, including quantum optics, spectroscopy, and laser science. One of his early achievements, and one of his most famous, was the 1955 discovery of the stabilization and labilization phenomenon of electronically excited polyatomic molecules. He additionally developed optical methods for measuring the temperature of molecules, as well as delayed fluorescence upon thermal excitation. For establishing the science of spectroscopy of complex molecules, he was awarded the 1980 Lenin Prize in science in technology, along with Viktar Hruzinski, Vital Taǔkačoǔ, and Bertold Neporent.

Another field of studies from which Borisevich found acclaim was the study of infrared radiation. Along with his assistant Viktor Vereshchagin, Borisevich developed the first optical filters to show infrared radiation, for which the two were awarded the 1973 USSR State Prize.

Throughout his lifetime, Borisevich authored more than 300 scientific papers, including three monographs, and was recognised as an active researcher who was devoted to his studies. He also contributed to the Russian Academy of Sciences from 1991, the Czechoslovak Academy of Sciences from 1977 until the organisation's dissolution, the Slovenian Academy of Sciences and Arts from 1981, and the European Academy of Sciences and Arts from 1991.

== Death ==
Borisevich died on 25 October 2015, at the age of 92. Upon his death, condolences were sent by President of Belarus Alexander Lukashenko to Borisevich's family and friends. Lukashenko said, "His entire life was an example of outstanding labor in the service of science and Belarus. Nikolai Borisevich has made possible the outstanding accomplishments of Belarusian science in the area of spectroscopy and luminescence, infrared technologies, laser physics."
