= Borys Buryak =

Ukrainian painter

Borys Buryak (born 25 October 1953 in Podvirne, Chernivtsi Oblast, in the Ukrainian SSR of the Soviet Union) is a Ukrainian painter. His works depict Ukrainian landscapes and urban views, or draw on the traditions of Ukrainian iconography.

Buryak graduated from the Ivan Trush College of Arts in 1974, and from the Lviv Academy of Arts in 1979. He is a member of the Union of Artists of Ukraine.

In 1991 he won the National Union of Artists Prize (Kyiv, 1991), and was recognised in the international "New Names" awards in Moscow in 1992. Buryak today lives and works in Lviv, Ukraine, where he runs a private art school.
