= Milkor BXP =

Milkor 9mm BXP Sub-Machine Gun
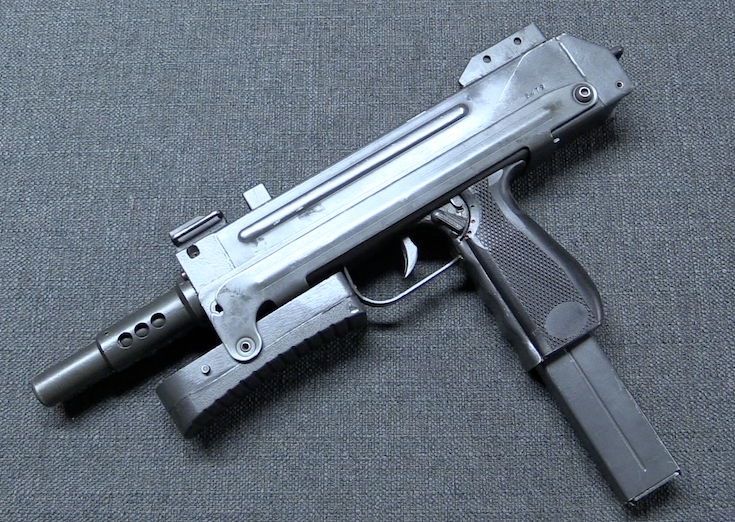
- The Milkor 9mm “BXP” Sub-Machine Gun
- Type: Submachine gun
- Place of origin: South Africa

Service history
- Used by: South African Police; South African Defence Force; South African Correctional Services; Private security companies

Production history
- Designer: Andries Piek
- Designed: Automatic: 1984; Semi-automatic: 1987
- Manufacturer: Milkor (Pty) Ltd 1984-1991; Supreme Technologies 1992-1993; Tressitu 1994-1998; Gary Barnes / Continental Weapons 1999-2003; Truvelo Armoury 2003-2010
- Produced: 1984–2010
- Variants: BXP fully automatic (1984); BXP semi-automatic (1987); BXP long barrel (414 mm)(1988)

Specifications
- Mass: 2.5 kg (5.51 lb)
- Length: 607 mm (23.9 in) stock extended / 387 mm (15.2 in) stock folded
- Barrel length: 208 mm (8.2 in)
- Cartridge: 9×19mm Parabellum
- Caliber: 9mm
- Action: Blowback
- Rate of fire: ~800 rounds/min
- Effective firing range: 50–100 m
- Feed system: 22 or 32-round detachable box magazine
- Sights: Iron sights Single Point IR sight

The BXP (which was also marketed later as the "Phoenix" in the USA) is a 9×19mm submachine gun developed by Andries Piek, with the fully automatic version finalised in 1978, and the semi-automatic version for civilians coming later in 1984. Due to an international arms embargo against South Africa, South Africans designed and manufactured some weapons as a small firearms industry developed locally. The BXP was one of these locally designed and developed firearms, and is considered the final stage of development of the line of hand machine carbines that started with the LDP in Rhodesia and the Kommando in South Africa. Produced originally by the South African company Milkor (Pty) Ltd, its name 'BXP' stands for 'Blowback eXperimental Parabellum', hinting both at its operating mechanism as well as its caliber. The original automatic version of the BXP was intended for use by South African law enforcement, including the South African Police, the Correctional Services, and the specialised airport security unit based at the then Jan Smuts International Airport, Johannesburg.

== History ==
In Southern Africa in the 1970s, the political situation was deteriorating in both Rhodesia and South Africa, leading to civil security problems, especially in isolated areas and farming communities. In this scenario, Uzi-like hand machine carbines chambered in 9mm Parabellum became popular as home defence weapons in isolated areas, particularly for use by ladies or teenagers because of their manageable recoil.

=== Background ===
In Rhodesia, from 1976 to 1978, Bulawayo Engineering developed the Rhogun, GM Steel produced the GM15 (fully automatic) and GM16 (semi-automatic), and Stellyte Co. manufactured the Cobra submachine gun and the Scorpion machine pistol, all derivatives of the CZ Model 25 and/or the Uzi.

Arguably the most successful of the hand machine carbines of this era was Lacoste Engineering's LDP (also known as the ‘Rhuzi’, or Rhodesian Uzi), launched in Rhodesia in 1976, which was a short while later also made under licence by Maxim Parabellum in South Africa, with a few minor modifications, from 1978 onwards.

A South African farmer, by the name of Andries Piek, ordered an LDP for himself from Rhodesia shortly after they were launched. However, when the shipment of LDPs arrived in South Africa, it was seized by the South African Police, who suspected that the firearms could be converted to fully automatic quite easily. The law in South Africa, then and now, does not allow civilians to own fully automatic firearms. The police sent the confiscated LDP firearms to the South African Bureau of Standards for evaluation in this regard.

While the LDPs were being examined by the Bureau of Standards, the Police allowed Andries Piek to examine his confiscated firearm with a view to seeing if he could find a way to adapt it to ensure that it could only ever fire in semi-automatic mode. He came up with such a design, of which the Police approved. The importer then contracted Andries Piek to perform the same adaptation on the entire shipment of LDPs, which the Police then released to their buyers.

Andries Piek then bought himself a Kommando, but did not find the folding stock to his satisfaction, so he designed a new style of stock with a different locking mechanism, which Maxim Parabellum incorporated into their revised Kommando design going forward.

After these two design successes, Maxim Parabellum employed Andries Piek, the 'accidental designer', on their firearm design team, where he worked with Alex du Plessis for some time.

=== Design ===
After reviewing both his original LDP and Kommando hand machine carbines, Andries Piek thought that he could design a simpler and better version, which was later to become known as the BXP (Blowback eXperimental Parabellum). The 1st prototype of the BXP was completed in 1978, using standard Uzi magazines and with a fixed wooden stock. The 2nd prototype of the BXP was completed in 1980, still using the Uzi magazine but now with the upper hinged to the front of the lower. The final prototype of the BXP, also known as the Advanced Development Model (ADM) was completed in 1982. It was by now fully ambidextrous, but had replaced the Uzi box-style magazine with the trapezoidal magazine first used by Carl Gustav on his Model 45 (also known as ‘Swedish K’), and had also replaced the Uzi safety lever with a rotating thumb-operated lever.

The Milkor BXP went into commercial production in 1984, at which time only the original fully automatic model was being manufactured. It was well received, and purchased by the South African Police for use by their specialized units, by the South African Defence Force for use by their Reconnaissance Commandos, by the specialist security element at Jan Smuts International Airport (now O. R. Tambo Airport) in Johannesburg, by the Department of Correctional Services, and by various municipalities for their officers.

Finally, a few years later in 1987, Andries Piek designed, and Milkor manufactured, the semi-automatic version of the BXP for civilian use. There are a significant number of design changes from the fully automatic to the semi-automatic versions (which is hammer fired from a closed bolt) with the result that the South African Police did not believe that the firearm could be converted to fully automatic fire, and were prepared to grant civilian licences for it.

=== Manufacturers ===
Milkor manufactured both the fully automatic and semi-automatic versions of the BXP until 1991, when the rights and stock of parts were passed on to Supreme Technologies, who used the existing parts to manufacture approximately 1,500 more semi-automatic BXPs from 1992 – 1993, all of which were practically identical to those made by Milkor.

The rights and stock of parts then passed to Tressitu, who manufactured another 1,500 fully and semi-automatic BXPs from 1994 – 1998. While the design of the BXP remained essentially unchanged, Tressitu introduced a few minor cosmetic changes, such as stamping the name ‘BXP’ into the firearm. Also the parts originally made by Milkor were getting finished, so Tressitu started making new barrel shrouds and flash hiders, and using new barrels supplied by Vektor, etc.

The rights to the BXP were then passed on to Gary Barnes of Continental Weapons from 1999 – 2003, who received very few original parts and had to start manufacturing new parts to assemble more firearms. In this process, Gary Barnes made a number of small design changes, and also started using parts from the R4 rifle, such as the front sight, side-folding stock, etc. because they were readily available at that time. As his version of the semi-automatic BXP started to look increasingly different to the original Milkor version of the BXP, Continental Weapons changed its name to ‘Phoenix’ and marked and marketed it as such.

Finally, the rights to the BXP passed on to Truvello in 2003, who still own the rights to this day. Truvello introduced a few new changes of its own, in particular separating the bolt into the bolt face and the bolt carrier for ease of manufacturing, and changing the extractor to one made by Lapua, resulting in a hybrid BXP that was part Milkor, part Gary Barnes, and part Truvelo.

Truvelo mostly sold its semi-automatic BXPs to private security companies from 2003 – 2010, and then mothballed the project.

== Design details ==
The weapon has the same T-shape as the Uzi- and MAC-10 submachine guns, and is manufactured in semi-automatic for civilian use and fully automatic for law enforcement use. Like its predecessors, such as the CZ Model 25 sub-machine gun of the 1940s, the Uzi of the 1950s, and the Walther MPK / MPL of the 1960s, the automatic version of the BXP fires from an open bolt, a tried and tested action by the time the BXP was developed in the early 1980s. However, the semi-automatic civilian version of the BXP fires from a closed bolt, which may be regarded as somewhat experimental in terms of the design of its action (hence the name).

Both the fully and semi-automatic versions are blowback operated. The bolt wraps around the rear of the barrel while closed to reduce length. The cocking-handle is at the top of the receiver. The BXP has an ambidextrous safety lever and a separate fire-mode selector built into the trigger. The law enforcement automatic version can be fired single-shot by partially-pressing the trigger, or in full-auto mode by fully-pressing the trigger. The interceptor notch catches the bolt if it is released during the cocking but prior to activating the sear. The weapon is coated with a rust-resistant coating which doubles as a dry lubricant coating.

Using a wide variety of available muzzle devices (including silencers, heat shields, and rifle grenades), the weapon can fire non-lethal or explosive projectiles by the means of blank cartridge in addition to normal ammunition. The BXP features an under-folding buttstock of stamped steel. The standard sights are open, but the BXP can be equipped with laser aiming modules and collimating sights.

The gun fires at about 800 rounds per minute, and is well-balanced and reasonably-accurate with a barrel length of 208 mm (8.2 in). The BXP uses a magazine that has the same size and shape as that of the Walther MPK, but the magazine retention notch is at a slightly different height. As with most other firearms of this class, i.e. of the same 9mm Parabellum caliber and with barrel lengths around 8 inches (200 mm) or so, the BXP is regarded as having an effective range of about 100 meters. With its folding stock extended, the BXP can be fired in a manner similar to a rifle, but the sharp edging of the stock extension makes the cheek weld very uncomfortable. With the stock folded forward, the BXP can also be fired single-handed in the style of a pistol.

== Users ==
- South Africa: Entered service with the South African Armed Forces in 1984. Also used by the South African Police Forces.
- Peru:Used by Air force Special Group with AIM1/D laser designators and by army Special Operation Forces

== See also ==
- Patria submachine gun
