= Baruch Podolsky =

Israeli linguist, lexicographer (1940–2011)

- ברוך פודולסקי
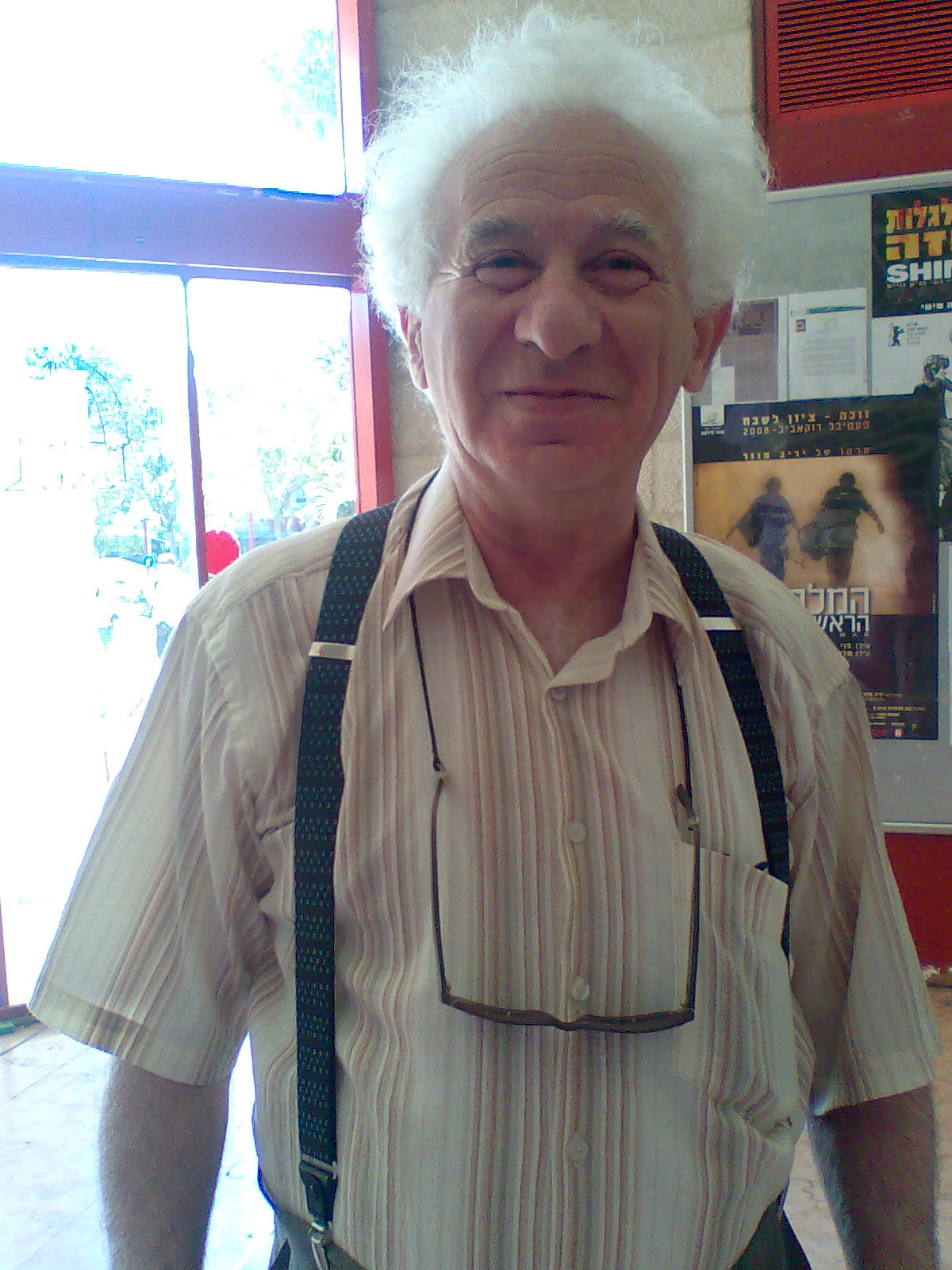
- Born: Boris Semenovich Podolsky; 18 February 1940; Moscow, Russia
- Died: 21 February 2011 (aged 71); Holon, Israel
- Citizenship: Israel
- Occupations: Linguist, lexicographer, and specialist in Hebrew, comparative linguistics, and Semitic languages
- Spouse: Lydia Kamen
- Parents: Semyon Moiseevich Podolsky (father); Dora Borisovna Kustanovich (mother)
- Website: http://www.slovar.co.il

Baruch (Boris) Semyonovich Podolsky (Hebrew: ברוך פודולסקי; 18 February 1940 – 21 February 2011) was an Israeli linguist, lexicographer, television and radio presenter, teacher, and noted expert in the field of Hebrew and Semitic languages. He authored a number of popular Hebrew dictionaries and science books.

== Early life in the Soviet Union ==
Podolsky was born in Moscow, Russia, on 18 February 1940. His mother, Dora Borisovna Kustanovich, graduated from the Jewish Pedagogical College and Moscow State Pedagogical Institute. After the faculty was closed, she worked as a teacher of Russian language and literature. His father, Semyon Moiseevich Podolsky, graduated from the history department of Moscow State University and taught history at the high school level.

Between 1941 and 1944, the family lived in the city of Orsk in the Southern Urals region; in 1944, Podolsky returned to Moscow.

Podolsky's parents were passionate about Jewish culture: they attended the Moscow State Jewish Theatre, subscribed to the newspaper Einikait, and owned a library of books in Yiddish.

Podolsky learned to read Yiddish from his mother. His father, using his grandmother's prayer book, taught him to read Hebrew as well.

After graduating from high school, Podolsky decided to study Semitic languages. During those years in the Soviet Union, Semitology could be studied in only two places: Tbilisi University, where teaching was conducted in the Georgian language, and the Eastern faculty of Leningrad University. In Leningrad, admission to this department occurred only once every two years, but not during that particular year. For this reason, Podolsky entered the Institute of Oriental Languages at Moscow State University, intending to study Arabic. However, the Arabic branch was not open that year, so he was accepted into the Hindi department.

In 1958, Podolsky and his parents were arrested on charges of "anti-Soviet agitation and propaganda using national prejudices" (under Article 58-10, part two, of the penal code) and "participation in an anti-Soviet organization" (under Article 58–11). The grounds for these arrests were their contact with employees of the Israeli embassy and their study of Hebrew. Podolsky was imprisoned in the Dubravlag labor camp (in the republic of Mordovia) for five years. In 1967, he was again sentenced to two years imprisonment for Zionist activities.

In 1971, Podolsky and his wife, Lydia Kamen, were repatriated to Israel.

=== Life in Israel ===
In Israel, Podolsky entered the Department of Semitic Linguistics at Tel Aviv University, where he completed bachelor's and master's degrees. These degrees were followed by a doctorate on the historical phonetics of the Amharic language; his dissertation was published in English in 1991 (as Historical Phonetics of Amharic).

Podolsky and Professor Veniamin Fain created the voluntary partnership Tarbut (Hebrew: תַרְבּוּת, "culture"), aimed at "promoting Jewish education in Russia". As part of its initiatives, Tarbut published the Hebrew self-study book Living Hebrew, which remains popular. In addition, Podolsky wrote the book Practical Grammar of the Hebrew Language (edited by Aron Dolgopolsky), which has been reprinted several times.

As a senior lecturer in the Department of Semitic Linguistics at Tel Aviv University, Podolsky taught several languages, primarily Amharic and Old Ethiopian. He taught courses on multiple areas of linguistics, including the following:

- map of the world's languages
- the origin of language
- an introduction to linguistics
- the origin of writing
- the language, phonetics, and phonology of Hindi
- the phonetics and morphology of modern Hebrew

Podolsky's lectures were popular—they were attended by students from other departments and faculties, in addition to external audiences. He also wrote articles and spoke at conferences.

Podolsky initially compiled a small Hebrew-Amharic dictionary, and then a medium-to-large version. During the final years of his life, he completed the compilation of an Amharic-Hebrew dictionary, with transcription and reverse translation index. The dictionary was published posthumously in Tel Aviv in 2012 by his wife Lydia Kamen (Stone). While still in a prison camp in the Soviet Union, he had collected materials on Urum, a Greek-Tatar language, and then exported them to Israel; he processed and published these materials in 1985.

After 1992, Podolsky was the editor-in-chief for the Hebrew-Russian Dictionary and Russian-Hebrew Dictionary. The resulting two-volume dictionary contained 26,000 words per volume. Although this dictionary was a success, Podolsky began creating an expanded version. This version contains approximately 50,000 words and expressions. An electronic version, on CD and online, was made by enthusiasts from the OLAN company; a Russian-Hebrew index was added, in addition to complete word forms, as follows:

- verb conjugations
- feminine forms and plurals of both adjectives and nouns
- combinations of prepositions with pronominal suffixes.

In 2007, the Newest Hebrew-Russian Dictionary was published, containing 50,000 words. In 2010, IRIS was released—a large Russian-Hebrew online dictionary containing approximately 65,000 words—which was prepared by Podolsky. The dictionary is available online and as a mobile application.

In later years, Podolsky worked to expand the Yiddish-Russian dictionary to 50,000 lexical units.

Until nearly the time of his death, Podolsky taught in the Department of Hebrew and Semitic Languages at Tel Aviv University. He taught several popular courses: Map of the World's Languages, Introduction to Linguistics, The Origin of Language, and The Origin of Writing. These courses attracted students from many university faculties, in addition to external audiences.

For many years, Podolsky hosted the program "Hebrew Language Lessons" (in Russian) on the Israeli national radio station REKA; this program was popular among expatriates from the former Soviet Union. As a popularizer of science and the Hebrew language, Baruch actively lectured; hosted an educational program on Channel 9 television in Israel; and wrote (or co-wrote) and published a number of popular science books and textbooks. Some of his science lectures and books, in addition to some of his broadcast recordings, are published on his memorial web page at Tel Aviv University.

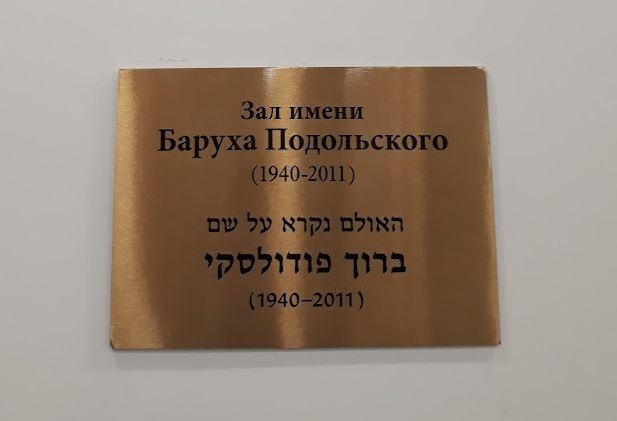
Memorial plaque for Baruch Podolsky in a library in Jerusalem

In 2004, Podolsky was elected Person of the Year in the category of "Contribution to science, medicine and education in Israel" by Channel 9. He was an honorary citizen of the city of Holon, Israel, where he lived for many years.

Podolsky died on 21 February 2011, in Holon.

Podolsky's lectures were recorded on a tape recorder by the refusenik and physician Moshe (Mieczyslaw) Vardi; some of these lectures were published by Baruch's widow, Lydia Kamen, in Hebrew and in Russian translation.
