= Milkor 380 =

Unmanned aerial vehicle

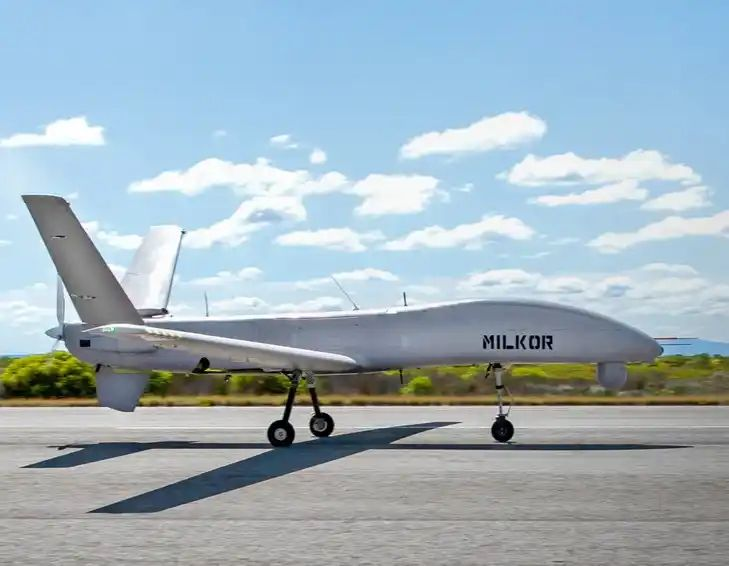
- Milkor 380 doing a takeoff run

General information
- Type: Unmanned combat aerial vehicle
- National origin: South Africa
- Manufacturer: Milkor
- Status: In service
- Primary user: South African Air Force

History
- Introduction date: February 2021
- First flight: 2023

The Milkor 380 is a Medium-altitude long-endurance (MALE) unmanned aerial vehicle (UAV), developed by the South African company Milkor. The project aimed to develop a fully South African UAV, the largest of its kind designed and manufactured in Africa, with all components built in-house. The maiden flight was on 19 September 2023.

The UAV has an operational range exceeding 2,000 kilometres, making it well-suited for long-range missions such as border surveillance, maritime patrols, and combat operations, featuring five hardpoints for various weapons and reconnaissance payloads.

The MA80 demonstrator conducted its maiden flight in 2017. Initial prototypes of the Milkor 380 were produced using a composite lay-up process. However, advancements in manufacturing techniques have led to the adoption of vacuum infusion resin manufacturing.

== Operators ==
South Africa

- South African Air Force – 5 in service as of 2024

== Specifications ==
=== General characteristics ===
- Length: 9 m
- Wingspan: 18.6 m
- Maximum Take-off Weight (MTOW): 1500 kg
- Fuel capacity: 315 kg
- Payload: 220 kg
- Powerplant: 1 x four-stroke, four-cylinder turbocharged Rotax 915 iS

=== Performance ===
- Maximum speed: 250 km/h
- Cruise speed: 110-150 km/h
- Range: 4000 km
- Endurance: 30 hr
- Service ceiling: 30,000 ft
- Operational altitude: 23,000 ft
