= Borys Kovtonyuk =

Ukrainian journalist (1948–2025)

- Борис Ковтонюк
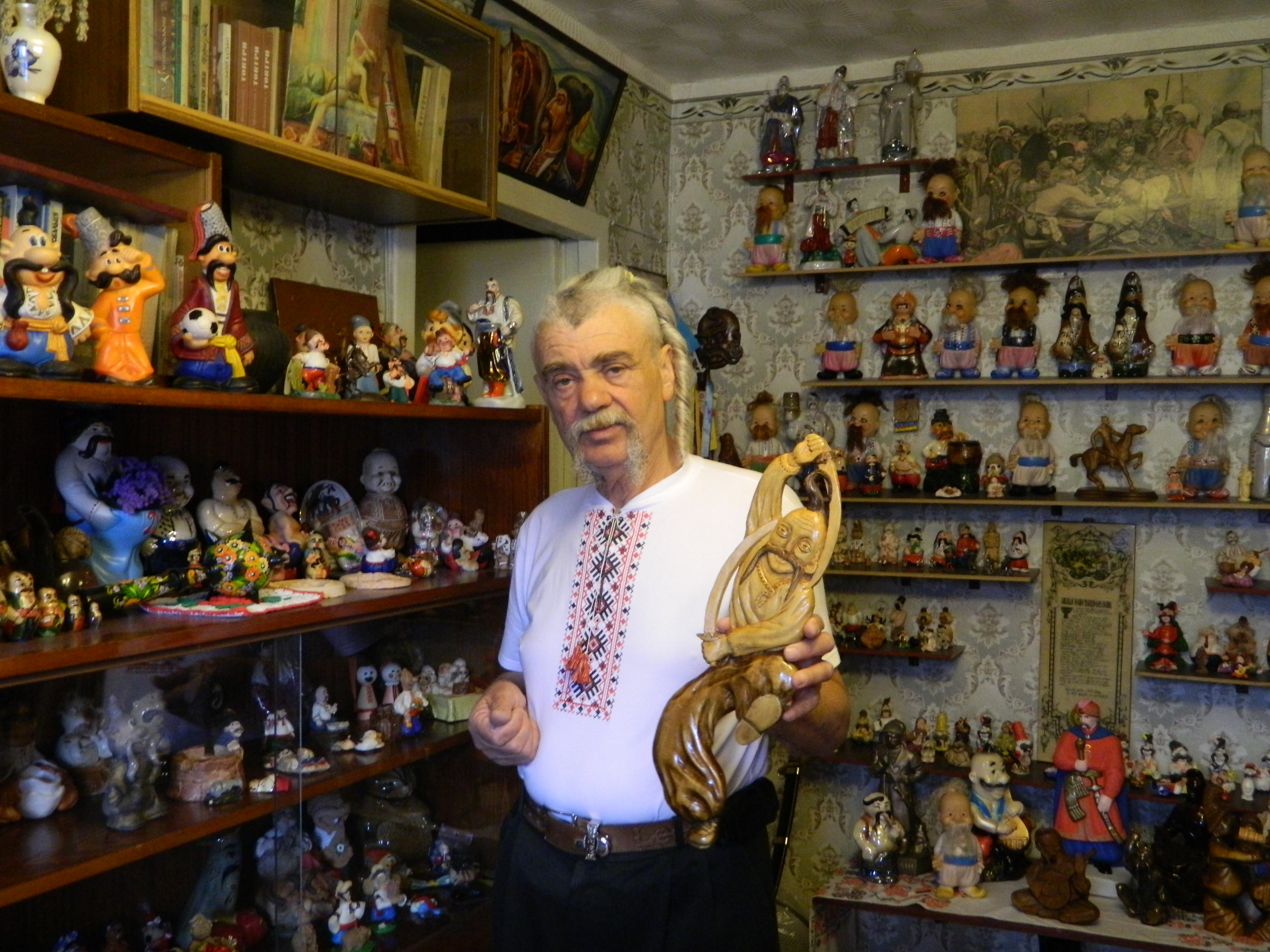
- Kovtonyuk in 2016
- Born: 28 September 1948; Ternove, Dnipropetrovsk Oblast, Ukrainian SSR, USSR
- Died: 12 August 2025 (aged 76); Dnipro, Ukraine
- Occupation: Writer

Borys Musiyovych Kovtonyuk (Ukrainian: Борис Мусійович Ковтонюк; 18 September 1948 – 12 August 2025) was a Ukrainian journalist, writer and local historian.

== Life and career ==
Borys Kovtoniuk was born on 18 September 1948 in the village of Ternove, Velykomykhailivska, Dnipropetrovsk Oblast. He worked as an electrician before enrolling at the Faculty of Journalism of Ivan Franko National University of Lviv in 1970. From 1977 to 1980, he held several head posts at the Builder of Communism newspaper. In 1980 he moved to Dnipro, where he worked as a correspondent, photojournalist, deputy editor-in-chief of the All-Ukrainian transport weekly Prydniprovska Magistral until he retired in 2008.

Kovtonyuk died in Dnipro on 12 August 2025, at the age of 76.
