= Borysewicz =

Borysewicz (Polish pronunciation: [bɔrɨˈsɛvitʂ]) is a surname of Polish-language origin. It may refer to:

- Eddie Borysewicz (1939–2020), Polish cycling coach
- Jan Borysewicz (born 1955), Polish musician and co-founder of Lady Pank

== See also ==
- Barysevich (surname)
