= Barys =

Barys is the Belarusian-language form of the given name Boris. It may refer to:

- Barys Haravoy (born 1974), retired Belarusian professional footballer
- Barys Hrynkevich (born 1981), retired amateur Belarusian freestyle wrestler
- Barys Kit (1910–2018), American rocket scientist
- Barys Pankrataw (born 1982), Belarusian footballer (goalkeeper)
- Barys Pukhouski (born 1987), Belarusian handball player
- Barys Rahula (1920–2005), Belarusian military commander serving during World War II
- Barys Tasman (1954–2022), Belarusian sports journalist

== See also ==
- Barry's (disambiguation)
- Barysh
