= Milkor MGL =

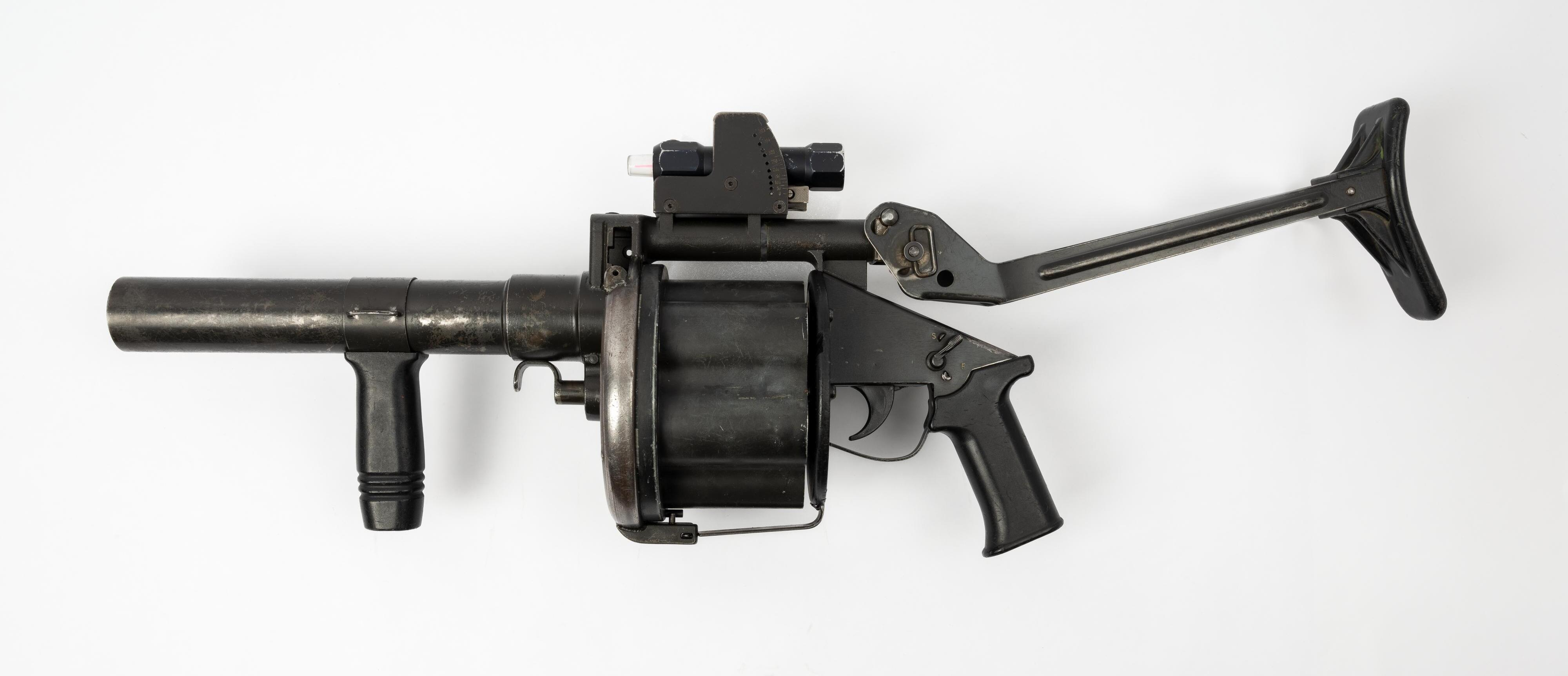
- Swedish Milkor MGL, 40 mm granatrevolver Armscor MGL (“shell revolver”)
- Type: Revolver grenade launcher
- Place of origin: South Africa

Service history
- In service: 1983–present
- Used by: See Users
- Wars: South African Border War; Kurdistan Workers' Party insurgency Rwandan Civil War; Colombian conflict Yugoslav Wars; War in Afghanistan (2001–2021); Iraq War; Syrian Civil War; Central African Republic Civil War (2012–present); 2013 Lahad Datu standoff Second Nagorno-Karabakh War; Russian invasion of Ukraine

Production history
- Designer: Andries C. Piek
- Designed: 1980
- Manufacturer: Milkor (Pty) Ltd
- Produced: 1983–present
- Variants: See Variants

Specifications
- Mass: 5.3 kg (12 lb)
- Length: 778 mm (30.6 in) stock extended 565 mm (22.2 in) stock folded
- Barrel length: 300 mm (11.8 in)
- Cartridge: 40×46mm grenade
- Action: Double-action
- Rate of fire: 3 rounds/sec (rapid fire); 18-21 rounds/min (sustained)
- Muzzle velocity: 75 m/s (250 ft/s)
- Effective firing range: 400 m (440 yd)
- Feed system: 6-round, revolver-type swing out cylinder
- Sights: Armson OEG collimator sight in quadrant

The Milkor MGL (Multiple Grenade Launcher) is a lightweight 40 mm six-shot revolver-type grenade launcher (variations also fire 37/38mm) developed and manufactured in South Africa by Milkor (Pty) Ltd. The MGL was demonstrated as a concept to the South African Defence Force (SADF) in 1981. The MGL was then officially accepted into service with the SADF as the Y2. After its introduction in 1983, the MGL was gradually adopted by the armed forces and law enforcement organizations of over 50 countries. Total production since 1983 has been more than 50,000 units.

The MGL is a multiple-shot weapon, intended to significantly increase a small squad's firepower when compared to traditional single-shot grenade launchers like the M203. The MGL is designed to be simple, rugged, and reliable. It uses the well-proven revolver principle to achieve a high rate of accurate fire which can be rapidly brought to bear on a target.

A variety of rounds such as HE, HEAT, anti-riot baton, irritant, and pyrotechnic can be loaded, then fired as fast as the trigger can be pulled. The cylinder can be loaded or unloaded rapidly to maintain a high rate of fire. Although intended primarily for offensive and defensive use with high-explosive rounds, with appropriate ammunition the launcher is suitable for anti-riot and other security operations. A newly patented modification allows the MGL to fire less lethal (very low pressure) rounds.

== Design ==
=== Operating mechanism ===
The MGL is a low-velocity, shoulder-fired 40 mm grenade launcher with a six-round spring-driven revolver-style magazine capable of accepting most 40×46mm grenades. The spring-driven cylinder rotates automatically while firing, but it must be wound back up after every reloading.

=== Features ===
The MGL grenade launcher consists of a lightweight, progressively rifled steel barrel, sight assembly, frame with firing mechanism, spring-actuated revolving cylinder magazine, and a folding stock. The weapon has a fire selector safety switch just above the rear pistol grip which can be operated from either side. The launcher cannot be accidentally discharged if dropped. The launcher is loaded by releasing the cylinder axis pin and swinging the steel frame away from the cylinder.

The rear of the cylinder (including the pistol grip) is unlatched and pivoted counter-clockwise to expose the chambers during reloading. By inserting the fingers into the empty chambers and rotating the aluminium cylinder it is then wound against its driving spring. The grenades are then inserted into the chambers, one-by-one (because the cylinder cannot be removed), the frame closed, and the axis pin re-engaged to lock.

When the trigger is pressed a double-action takes place and the firing pin is cocked and released to fire the grenade. Gas pressure on a piston unlocks the cylinder and allows the spring to rotate it until the next chamber is aligned with the firing pin, whereupon the next round can be fired. If a misfire occurs the trigger can be pulled repeatedly.

=== Sights ===
The Y2, amongst other models, is equipped with the Armson Occluded Eye Gunsight (OEG), a collimator sight which provides a single aiming post. The shooter aims with both eyes open and the post is superimposed onto the target, both being in focus. The OEG on the Y2 is designed as an aid to range estimation, the post being equal to the height of a man at 200 m (660 ft). It is also fitted with tritium illumination for low light operation which has a life of at least ten years. The range quadrant is graduated in 25 m (82 ft) increments.

=== Accessories ===
Each MGL is supplied with a sling, cleaning kit, and user's manual.

== Variants ==
Several upgrades were made to the original design in the last decade. After over 12 years of production, and more than a decade of user feedback from different countries around the world, it became evident that a redesign of some component groups would make the weapon even more user-friendly and reliable while also simplifying maintenance. This development, known as the MGL Mk-1 was introduced to the market in 1996. All weapons previously supplied can be upgraded to the Mk 1 configuration. Parts, such as the steel barrel, are interchangeable with a minimum of workshop modifications involving a few special tools and cutting dies.

Two "product improved" variants were introduced in 2004. The first is the Mk 1S, which replaces the aluminum frame of the Mk 1 with a stronger stainless steel body, a conventional trigger unit, and Picatinny rail support at the top, sides and bottom of the forend. The second variant is the Mk 1L, with the same features as the Mk 1S, but with a 140 mm (5.5 in) long cylinder to fit special-purpose grenades such as tear gas canisters and less-lethal impact rounds that are too long to fit in the other models' shorter cylinder. The Mk 1L also features a sliding buttstock.

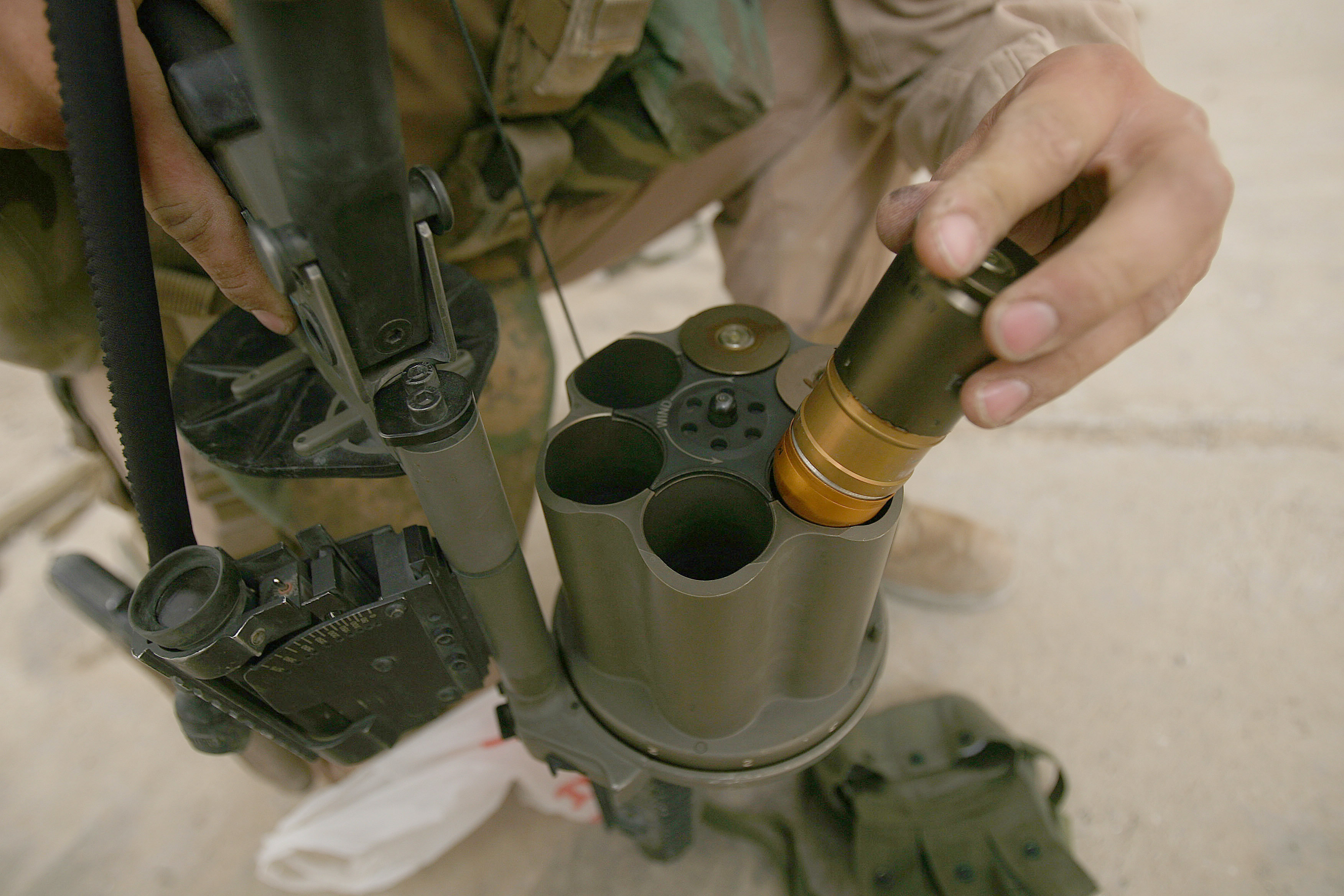
Loading 40 mm grenades into USMC M32 launcher.

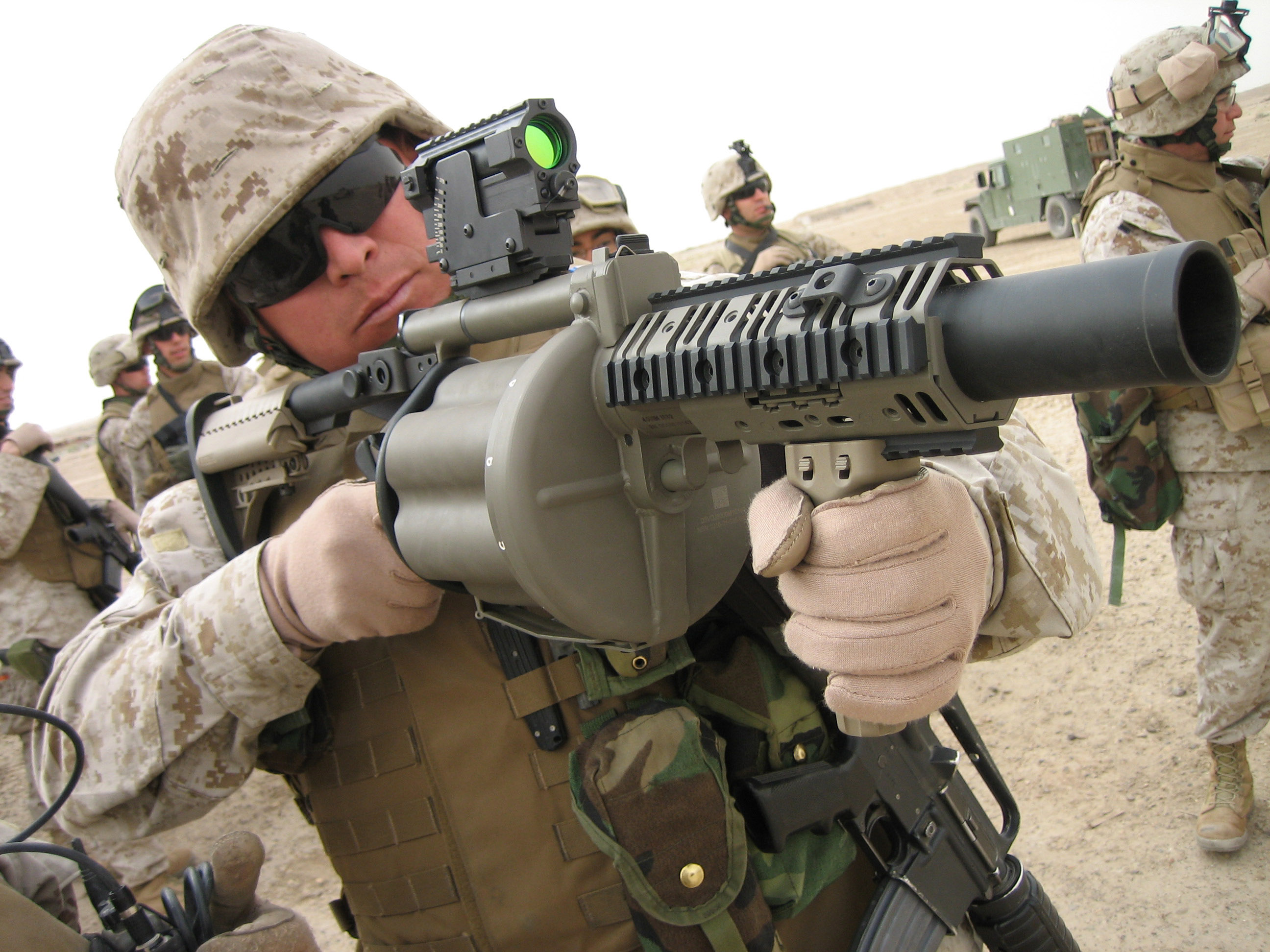
US marine looks through the M2A1 reflex sight on the M-32.

In 2006, the Milkor 37/38mm Multiple Anti-Riot (MAR) replaced the 40mm less-lethal Yima. The MAR is largely identical to other MGL models, but is adapted to fire standard 37/38mm less-lethal riot control rounds available today.

The Milkor SuperSix MRGL (Multi-range Grenade Launcher) was developed in 2012 and features a new recoil reduction system, redesigned stock, strengthened construction and new optics. The SuperSix MRGL is capable of firing a wide range of low velocity (LV) and medium velocity (MV) munitions, which enables the user to engage a wider range of targets than possible with previous launchers, with a maximum range of 800 to 1,200 m (2,600 to 3,900 ft). Rounds can be fired in a rapid succession of six rounds in less than 3 seconds (operator dependent) and has a standard six-shot area coverage of at least 20 m × 60 m (66 ft × 197 ft).

=== Milkor USA ===
Milkor USA, Inc. is an American company that produces copies of the Milkor MGL. Milkor (Pty) Ltd has no affiliation or working relationship with Milkor USA.

Milkor USA previously produced the Mk 1S as the MGL-105, and the Mk 1L as the MGL-140, both referring to their respective chamber lengths.

A Video of U.S. Marines training with the M32A1

In 2005, the United States Marine Corps procured 200 MGL-140s, designated as the "M32 Multi-shot Grenade Launcher" (M32 MGL or M32 MSGL). They were initially field tested in 2006. The M32 is equipped with the M2A1 reflex sight, a AAA battery–powered sight with infrared settings for night operations. Its elevation adjusts in 25 m (82 ft) increments and compensates for drift, and its casing features a Picatinny rail on top.

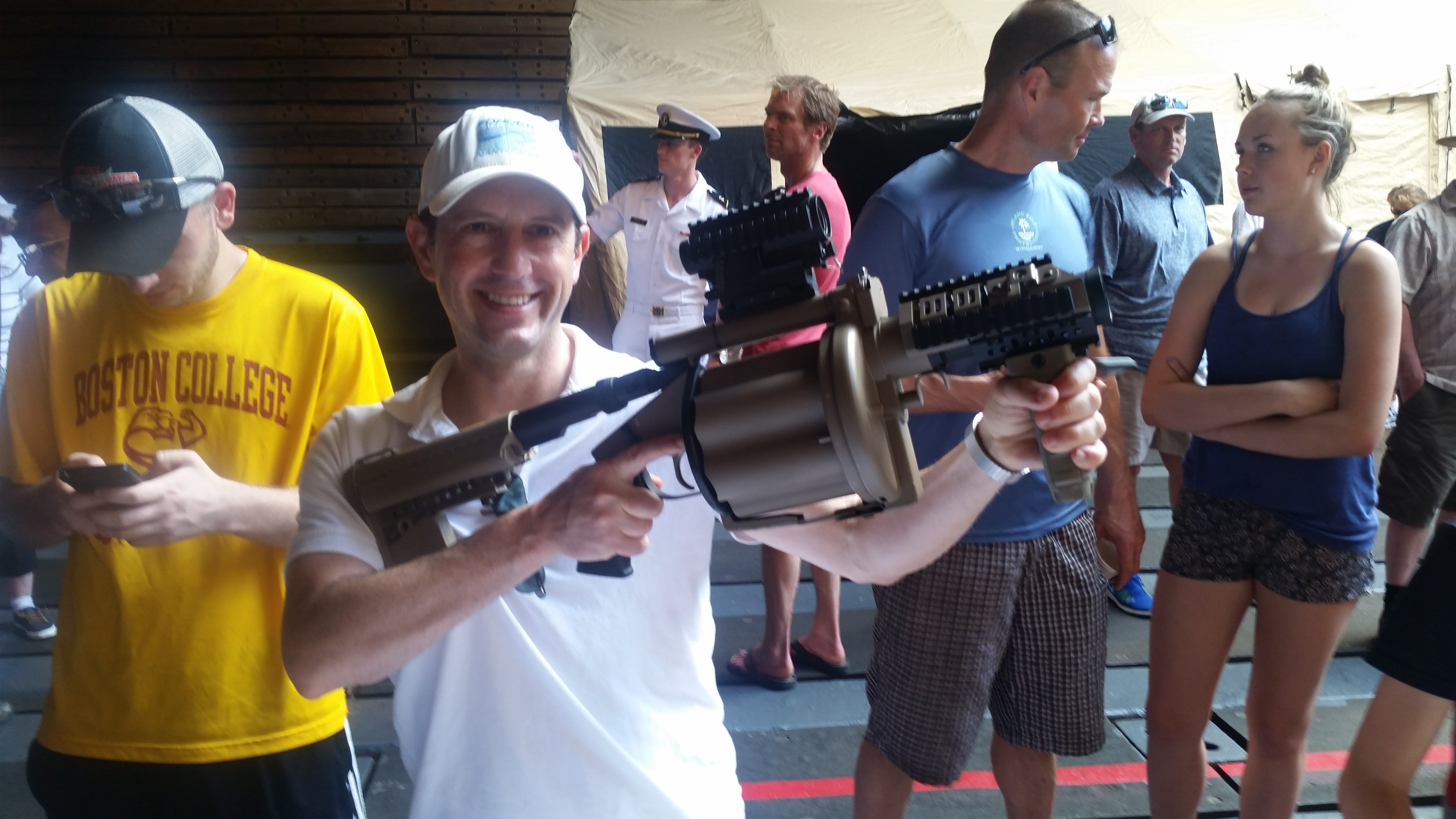
M32 A1 MGL on display aboard the USS Wasp (LHD-1)

In 2014, Milkor USA dropped the MGL-105 and MGL-140, and introduced a shorter-barreled variant, the M32A1. Despite the shorter barrel (8 in (20 cm) instead of 12 in (30 cm)), it weighs the same as the M32, because its receiver, stock and other parts of the weapon were strengthened, in anticipation of higher pressure medium velocity rounds sought by United States Special Operations Command. The M32A1 has been adopted by the U.S. Marine Corps as the M32A1 Multi-shot Grenade Launcher, and by USSOCOM as the Mk 14 Mod 0.

== Users ==
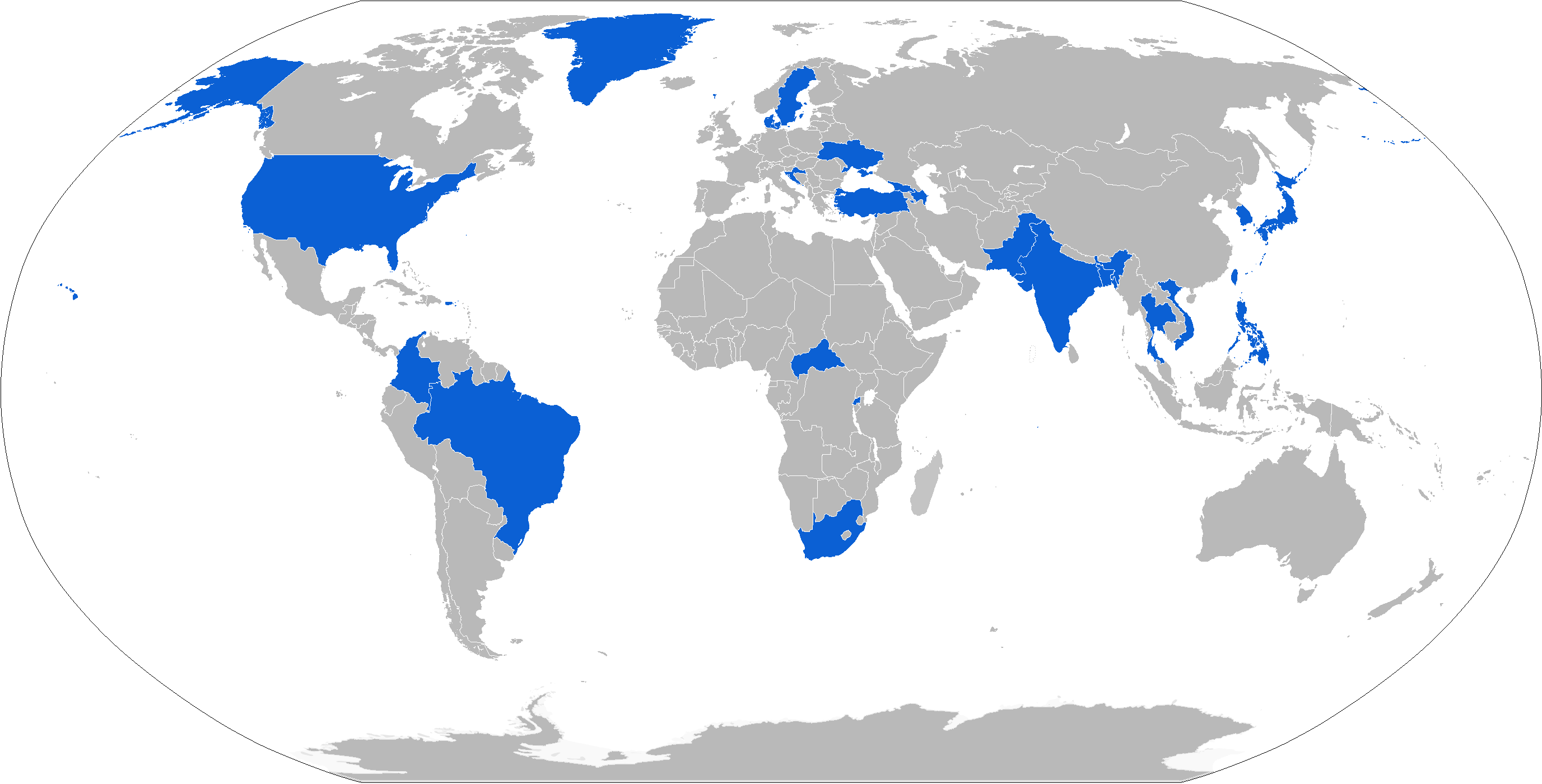
Map with nations that use the Milkor MGL in blue

Country	Organization name	Model	Quantity	Date	Reference
Azerbaijan	Azerbaijani Land Forces	—	—	—	
Bangladesh	Bangladesh Army	Mk1	—	—	
Bangladesh	Bangladesh Air Force	—	—	—	
Brazil	Brazilian Army	—	—	—	
Central African Republic	Séléka	—	1+	2013	
Colombia	Indumil produces the MGL Mk 1 under license.	—	—	—	
Croatia	Locally produced by Metallic d.o.o.	RBG-6	—	—	
Denmark	Royal Danish Army—Military Police & Jaeger Corps	Y2	—	—	
Georgia	Georgian Land Forces	—	—	—	
India	Licensed produced by the Ordnance Factory Tiruchirappalli as the Multi Grenade Launcher.	—	—	—	
Japan	Used by the Japan Ground Self-Defense Force.	M32A1	—	—	
Malaysia	Used by the Malaysian Army.		—	—	
Pakistan	Pakistan Army	—	—	—	
Pakistan	Special Services Group counter-terrorism team of the Pakistan Army	—	—	—	
Philippines	Philippine Army	—	—	—	
Philippines	Philippine Marine Corps	—	—	—	
Rwanda	Rwanda Defence Force	"40mm MGL"	70	1992	
Rwanda	Rwandan Patriotic Front	"40mm MGL"	some captured	—	
South Africa	South African Army	Y2	—	—	
South Korea	Republic of Korea Navy Special Warfare Flotilla	M32A1	—	—	
Sri Lanka	Sri Lanka Army	Armscor	—	—	
Sweden	Swedish Armed Forces, tested at KA3, Gotland 1996–2000, not in service.	Granatkastargevär 90	—	—	
Taiwan	Republic of China Army	—	—	—	
Thailand	Royal Thai Navy	—	—	—	
Turkey	Turkish Army. Produced by MKEK	—	—	—	
Turkey	Gendarmerie General Command	—	—	—	
Ukraine	Ukrainian Air Assault Forces	M32A1 MGL	—	—	
United States	United States Marine Corps	M32 MGL; M32A1 MGL	—	—	
United States	United States Special Operations Command	M32A1 MGL (as Mk 14 Mod 0)	—	—	
Vietnam	Produced by the General Department of Defense Industry for the People's Army of Vietnam	SPL40L (Industry Name)	—	—	

== See also ==
- Hawk MM-1 – (United States)
- RG-6 grenade launcher – (Russia, Soviet Union)
- RGP-40 – (Poland)
- Brügger & Thomet GL06 – (Switzerland)
