= Type 15 tank =

Chinese light tank

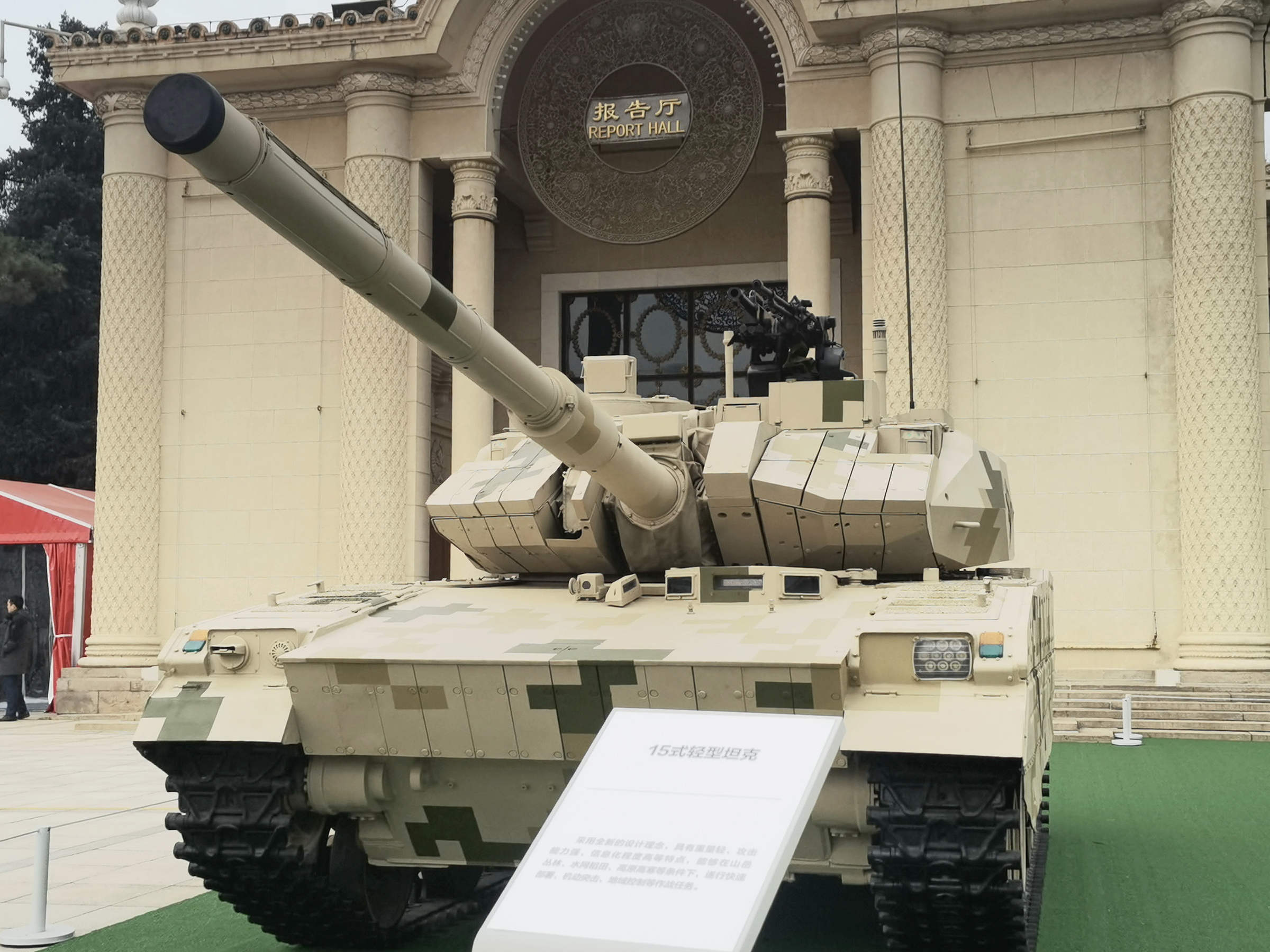
- Type 15 tank at Beijing exhibition hall
- Type: Light tank
- Place of origin: China

Service history
- Used by: See Operators

Production history
- Designer: 201st Research Institute
- Manufacturer: Jianglu Electromachinery; Baotou Tank Plant
- No. built: 1000+

Specifications
- Secondary armament: Remotely operated weapon station armed with coaxial 12.7mm machine gun and QLZ-04 automatic grenade launcher
- Engine: Electronically controlled diesel engine 8V132 with fully-automatic transmission 1
- Power/weight: 30.30 hp/tonne 27.8 hp/tonne (Enhanced armor package installed)
- Suspension: Hydropneumatic suspension
- Operational range: 469 kilometres (291 mi)(without external fuel drums)
- Maximum speed: 70 kilometres per hour (43 mph)

The Type 15 (Chinese: 15式轻型坦克; pinyin: yīwǔ shì qīngxíng tǎnkè, also designated ZTQ15), codenamed the Black Panther (Chinese: 黑豹; pinyin: hēi bào), is a Chinese third generation light tank family operated by the People's Liberation Army Ground Force, People's Liberation Army Navy Marine Corps, and People's Liberation Army Air Force Airborne Corps. The tank has also been exported to the Bangladesh Army. The export version of the tank is known as VT5.

== Development ==
The Type 15 entered mass production in 2016. In December 2018, the tank was officially acknowledged to be in active service. It was showcased in the 70th National Day parade on October 1, 2019.

== Design ==
=== Armament ===
The Type 15 light tank features a fully stabilized 105 mm rifled gun, which is reportedly superior to the old ZPL-94 105 mm rifled gun fitted on the Type 88 and Type 59 tanks. It is reported that the main gun has an effective firing range of 3 km and is compatible with all standard NATO 105 mm tank ammunition.

The ammunition selections include APFSDS, HEAT and HE (High explosive) rounds and gun-launched ATGM. APFSDS and HEAT rounds are used against enemy armor while HE rounds are used against enemy infantry positions, light/non-armored vehicles, buildings, and field fortifications. The APFSDS projectiles are capable of penetrating 500 mm (20 in) of armored steel at 2,000 metres (1.2 mi).

To defeat well-protected opponents, the tank would use the 105 mm gun-launched ATGM with tandem high-explosive anti-tank (HEAT) warheads, offering much higher penetration. The missile reportedly has a range of 5 km and is also capable of engaging low-flying helicopters.

Other armament includes a QJT-88 5.8 mm coaxial machine gun, a remotely controlled weapon station mounted on the turret roof, which is fitted with QLZ-04 35 mm automatic grenade launcher and QJC-88 12.7 mm heavy machine gun.

=== Electronics ===
Type 15 features modern sensory and fire control systems, including laser rangefinder, advanced ballistic computer, meteorological sensors, gunner thermal imaging sight, millimeter-wave radar.

Other equipment includes air conditioning system, oxygen-production equipment for the crew, command and control equipment, battlefield management system, and navigation suite fitted with both inertial navigation system (INS) and satellite navigation system.

=== Protection ===
Unlike previous Chinese tanks with carousel-style autoloader, the ammunition in Type 15 is retrieved from a tail autoloader with blowout panels. The ammunition is stored in the turret bustle for improved safety.

Standard armor package features steel armor protection with additional layers of advanced composite armor panels covering the tank turret, hull, and two sides, with additional lightweight explosive reactive armor blocks protecting the front hull. The enhanced package features thicker explosive reactive armor (ERA) blocks, in addition to the composite armor panels underneath, covering the whole tank turret and hull. ERA mounted armor-skirt and slat armor can also be mounted on the side and rear side of the tank hull for additional protection. Enhanced armor set is designed for open area battle under heavy defensive conditions.

The Type 15 light tank is fitted with a laser warning sensor system to detect incoming rangefinding and anti-tank missiles, and the tank can automatically deploy smoke grenades in dischargers if the tank is being illuminated by enemy laser beam. Chinese-designed active protection system can be mounted on export-oriented VT-5 variant as per customer request. Other protective features include chemical, biological, radiological and nuclear (CBRN) protection, and fire suppression system. The vehicle also features oxygen generators to aid in high-altitude operations.

=== Mobility ===
Due to its lighter weight, the Type 15 tank can be more easily airlifted. Xi'an Y-20 transport planes can only carry one Type 99 tank but can carry up to two Type 15 tanks and achieve long-range deployment of 7,800 kilometers.

== Operational history ==
During the China-India border dispute along the Line of Actual Control (LAC) in June 2020, Type 15 tanks were reportedly deployed in the Tibetan Plateau.

== Variants ==
A footage of export variant VT-5 tank taken in 2018.

Type 15 / ZTQ-15

Designation for military version.

Type 15 Armored Recovery Vehicle

Armored recovery vehicle based on Type 15 chassis.

VT-5
VN17 :Export ifv variant based on the VT-5
VT-5BD

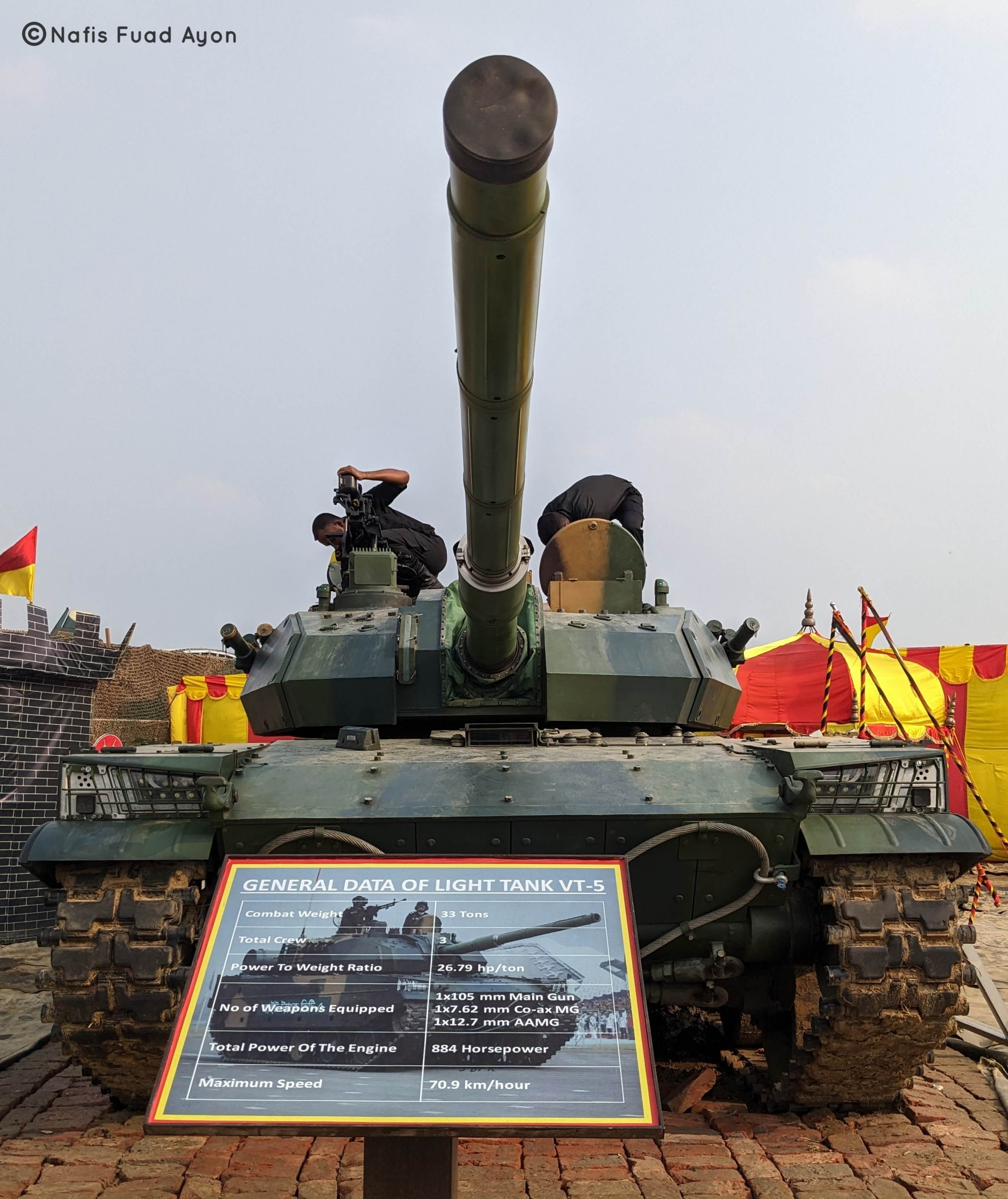
Bangladesh Army VT-5 on display

Customized variant of VT-5 made for Bangladesh Army. The main armament 105 mm rifled gun is improved with thermal sleeve and fume extractor system. The tanks are equipped with GL-5 APS.

== Operators ==
China

- People's Liberation Army Ground Force: 500 units as of 2022.
- People's Liberation Army Navy Marine Corps: some as of 2022.
- (China) People's Liberation Army Air Force Airborne Corps

Bangladesh

- Bangladesh Army: 46 VT-5BD units

== See also ==
- Type 62 – Chinese light tank

=== Contemporary competitors ===
- Kaplan MT / Harimau – Turkish/Indonesian light tank
- M10 Booker – Cancelled American assault gun, briefly selected by the US Army for Mobile Protected Firepower program
- WPB Anders – Polish light tank
- Sabrah light tank – Spanish/Israeli light tank based on ASCOD and Pandur II, ordered by Philippines
- Zorawar – Indian light tank.

=== Tanks with similar firepower ===
- M8 Armored Gun System – American light tank proposal was canceled in the 1990s
- PL-01 – Cancelled Polish light tank prototype
- 2S25 Sprut-SD – Russian amphibious light tank
- K21-105 – South Korean light tank
