= Muhammad Abu Sayed Siddique =

Abu Sayed Siddique
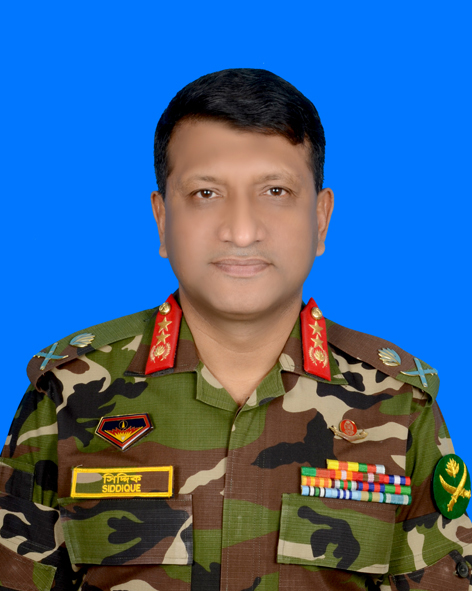
- Maj Gen Md Abu Sayed Siddique
- Born: 1 January 1967 (age 59)
- Military career
- Allegiance: Bangladesh
- Branch: Bangladesh Army
- Service years: 1986 - 2022
- Rank: Major General
- Service number: BA - 3126
- Unit: Ordnance Corps
- Commands: Master General of Ordnance of Army Headquarters; Commandant of Ordnance Center and School; Commandant of CMTD, Dhaka; Commandant of CMTD, Rajendrapur; Commandant of COD, Rajendrapur
- Conflicts: UNMEE; ONUMOZ; UNMIS; UNMISS
- Awards: Sena Utokorsho Padak(SUP); Oshamanno Sheba Padak(OSP); Sena Parodorshita Padak (SPP)

Muhammad Abu Sayed Siddique (Note: Bengali: মো. আবু সাঈদ সিদ্দিক) (Note: OSP, SUP, SPP, afwc, psc, Phd) is a retired two-star officer of the Bangladesh Army who served as the master general of ordnance and chairman of Jolshiri Abashon. Siddique was also a member of the board of trustees at Bangladesh Army University of Science and Technology.

== Education and training ==
Siddique finished high school at Rangpur Cadet College. He was then recruited into the Bangladesh Military Academy in 1984. He received his commission with the 15th BMA long course in the Ordnance Corps in December 1986. He is a graduate of the Defence Services Command and Staff College and the Armed Forces War College. Siddique obtained two master's degrees from National University, Bangladesh. One is in defence studies, while the other is in war studies. He also obtained his PhD degree from Jahangirnagar University. His PhD agenda was on Public Procurement. Siddique also attended a capstone course on national security and strategic studies from National Defence College in 2018.

== Military career ==
Siddique instructed at the Ordnance Centre and School and commanded three divisional ordnance depots as a major and lieutenant colonel. He was then promoted to colonel and tenured as commandant of central ordnance depot in Rajendrapur Cantonment. He was then transferred to Army headquarters and promoted to brigadier general for serving as director of the Ordnance Directorate. He then commanded the central ordnance depot of Dhaka Cantonment.

Not long after, Siddique was designated as the most senior officer of the Ordnance Corps while serving as commandant of the ordnance centre and school. He was upgraded to major general and appointed as master general of ordnance back at army headquarters. He was also honoured with the title colonel commandant of ordnance corps in 2017. In 2018, Siddique inaugurated the Qirat and Azan competition at the Air Force Central Jame Masjid as chief patron. He also orchestrated the establishment of the Ordnance Museum Complex and put exertion on stationing QW missiles and Type 15 tanks in Ramu Cantonment.

Siddique was instrumental in the agreement with Bashundhara Group over the Jolshiri project on 2 September 2020, in which Bashundhara provided 860 acres to Jolshiri Abashon. Siddique visited Sylhet to distribute aid under former chief of army staff general Shafiuddin Ahmed and then Sylhet area commander major general Hamidul Haque among people affected by flooding. Siddique went on leave per retirement in 2022. Currently he is serving as an advisor of the Governance Policy Explorer Center.

=== UN missions ===
Siddique participated in United Nations peacekeeping missions four times. First as an observer operative in Eritrea in 1993. He was then appointed as ordnance officer in command of BANENGR-5 in Mozambique. Siddique was also deployed with the Bangladesh battalion in 2008 for the United Nations Mission in Sudan and in 2011 for the United Nations Mission in South Sudan.

== Personal life ==
Siddique is married to Taslim Jahan.
