= 35 mm =

35 mm may refer to:

== Film ==
- 135 film, a type of still photography format commonly referred to as "35 mm film"
- 35 mm movie film, a type of motion picture film stock
- 35MM, a "musical exhibition" by Ryan Scott Oliver that features music played to photos

== Military ==
- 35 mm grenade, a Chinese grenade launcher ammunition
- Oerlikon GDF, a 35 mm anti-aircraft cannon
