= Jolshiri =

Area in Dhaka, Bangladesh

Coordinates: 23.8029965°N 90.5005645°E

Jolshiri Abason
- Founding leader: General Iqbal Karim Bhuiyan
- Chairman: Major General Md. Abu Sayed Siddique, SUP, SPP, afwc, psc
- Managing Director: Brigadier General S M Anwar Hossain, afwc, psc

Jolshiri Abashon is an under-construction residential area being developed as an extension of the Dhaka city by Jolshiri Abashon Corporation, a sister corporation of the Army Officers Housing Scheme, in Rupganj Upazila, Narayanganj District, Bangladesh. It is exclusively built for Bangladesh Army officers. It was referred to by the name Army Housing Scheme in the past.

== History ==
In 2010, Army Housing Scheme purchased 1400 bigha for the Jolshiri residential project. Quarter Master General of the Bangladesh Army was the Chairman of the Scheme. The plan was to purchase up to 13 thousand bigha or 4333 acres in Rupganj Upazila, Narayanganj District. On 24 October 2010, seven thousand residents of Rupganj laid siege to Tanmushury camp, of Bangladesh Army, involved with the Army Housing Scheme. The protesters had clashed with law-enforcement personnel. In the ensuing violence, 50 people were injured, including 15 who were shot by members of the Rapid Action Battalion. Bangladesh Police reported that their personnel did not fire any rounds. The Army officers were airlifted out of the camp. The protesters then burned down the camp and two vehicles of the Bangladesh Army.

The protesters accused Bangladesh Army of forcefully purchasing their lands. They accused the local Member of Parliament, Golam Dastagir Gazi, of supporting the Army officers buying land at Rupganj for below market rates. Gazi denied the allegations against him and described them as a conspiracy by the opposition party Following the protests; cases were filed against three to four thousand people by Rapid Action Battalion. Members of the Bangladesh Police and Armed Police Battalion were stationed there to maintain peace. Male residents of Rupganj went into hiding, fearing arrest following the filing of cases. Shops were closed in Rupganj and carried a deserted look. Three villagers were missing after the clash. One protester, Mostafa Jamal Haider, died of bullet injuries at the National Institute of Cardiovascular Diseases. Police officers at the scene said Army officers were using government vehicles and resources for the private development project. Inter Services Public Relations denied the camps were army camps, despite being manned by uniformed personnel, and called them temporary project site offices. One missing man was discovered in Army custody and was at Combined Military Hospital. The army personnel had taken him while being airlifted out of the camp.

The Daily Star criticized the presence of Army officers at the local land registry office monitoring the land sale. It also questioned the appropriateness of serving army officers managing a private corporation and the legal basis of the development project. On 30 October, Bangladesh Army sued 50-60 people over the protests at Rupganj Police Station. Relatives of the missing accused the authorities of shooting the missing and taking away their bodies. Bangladesh Army had established several camps in Rupganj Upazila. They established a presence at the local land registry office and would refuse to let people sell their land to anyone other than the army. The army also offered a price lower than the market rate. The army defended its role in the project by describing it as government-approved, but Abdul Mannan Khan, State Minister for Housing and Public Works, denied any knowledge of the project. The army recorded all sales at the land office. They prevent registering land, an Eid prayer ground, as Waqf property. The lands sold to the project were recorded at a lower value than the selling price to dodge taxes.

On 28 October 2010, Prime Minister Sheikh Hasina approved the Army Housing Scheme and asked them to ensure no conflicts with locals. Bangladesh Army also decided to scale down the project in light of the protests Jolshiri Abashon was incorporated on 11 April 2011 under the companies act, 2011. A board of directors leads it, and Major General Md. Abu Sayed Siddique is the board chairman. Brig Gen Ohidul Alam Chowdhury, PPM, SPP, ndc, psc, is the current Managing Director of this project. It was given the responsibility to develop Jolshiri Abashon which is 2100 acre property in Rupganj Upazila, Narayanganj District which is on the outskirts of Dhaka.

On 4 June 2019, General Aziz Ahmed, chief of the Bangladesh Army, inaugurated the construction of buildings for Adamjee Public School and College, Bangladesh International School and College, and Jolshiri Public School and College at Jolshiri Abashon.

== Environmental impact ==
The site is situated in a designated flood flow zone of Dhaka. According to Dhaka Metropolitan Development Plan, this area cannot be developed or built upon. Md Nurul Huda, Chairman of Rajdhani Unnayan Kartripakkha, said that Army officials did not consult them or seek their approval for the project's construction. Major General Iqbal Karim Bhuiyan was the chairman of the scheme in 2010. Department of Environment fined Jolshiri Abashon for lacking an environment clearance certificate in 2015. It was fined following a hearing at the department headquarters in Dhaka. Chairman of Jolshri Abashon questioned the detailed area plan (DAP) in November 2017 in a meeting with real estate agents and Rajdhani Unnayan Kartripakkha. The developers questioned the need for wetlands and water retention areas.

== See also ==
- Anondo Police Housing Society
- Army International Islamic Institute
