= QLG-10 =

Grenade launcher

The QLG-10 and QLG-10A are a family of Chinese 35 mm under-barrel grenade launchers designed for QBZ-95 and QBZ-95-1 of assault rifles. The launcher fires 35mm caseless grenades, designated DFS-10.

== Design and development ==
QLG-10 is a single-shot, manual, front-loading grenade launcher. The grenade launcher is pre-engraved with rifling to provide in-flight stabilization with rotation. The standard projectile weighs 169 grams with a muzzle velocity of 78 meters per second.

Type 10 projectile is caseless and low velocity, designed for shoulder fire and handheld operations. Type 10 grenade utilizes high-low cartridge designed for low recoil operation with extended range. The grenade has an effective range of 400 meters.

An iron sight is provided with seven adjustable range marks. The YMAL10-35 red dot sight can be attached to the left side of the grenade launcher, providing range-finding function.

=== Grenade Types ===
Four types of grenades are available:

- DFS-10 High Explosive Fragmentation Grenade (Chinese: DFS-10碰炸杀伤榴弹): effective against infantry personal inside 400 m (1,300 ft) range.
- DFS-10A Bouncing Air-burst Fragmentation Grenade (Chinese: DFS-10A跳炸杀伤榴弹): 400 m (1,300 ft) range. It's equipped with pre-set airburst munition and jump-up detonation fuse, similar to US M397A1 40mm cartridge.
- DFJ-10 High Explosive Dual Purpose Grenade (Chinese: DFJ-10破甲杀伤榴弹): effective against infantry personal inside 400 m (1,300 ft) range, as well as against light vehicles in 100 m (330 ft) range.
- DFX-10 Trajectory Marker Grenade (Chinese: DFX-10弹道指示榴弹): 400 m (1,300 ft) range, releasing colored smoke at the target location.

== Variants ==
QLG-10
Original variant designed for QBZ-95 and can be attached to QBZ-95-1.
QLG-10A
Redesigned new variant that can be attached to QBZ-95-1, QBZ-95B-1, and compatible to the QBZ-95. The new variant has a redesigned trigger mechanism.

== Users ==
- China: People's Liberation Army

== See also ==
- Type 91 grenade launcher

International:

- M203
- M320
- GP-34
