= QLZ-87 =

Type of Grenade launcher

QLZ-87 (Type 87 Grenade Launcher)
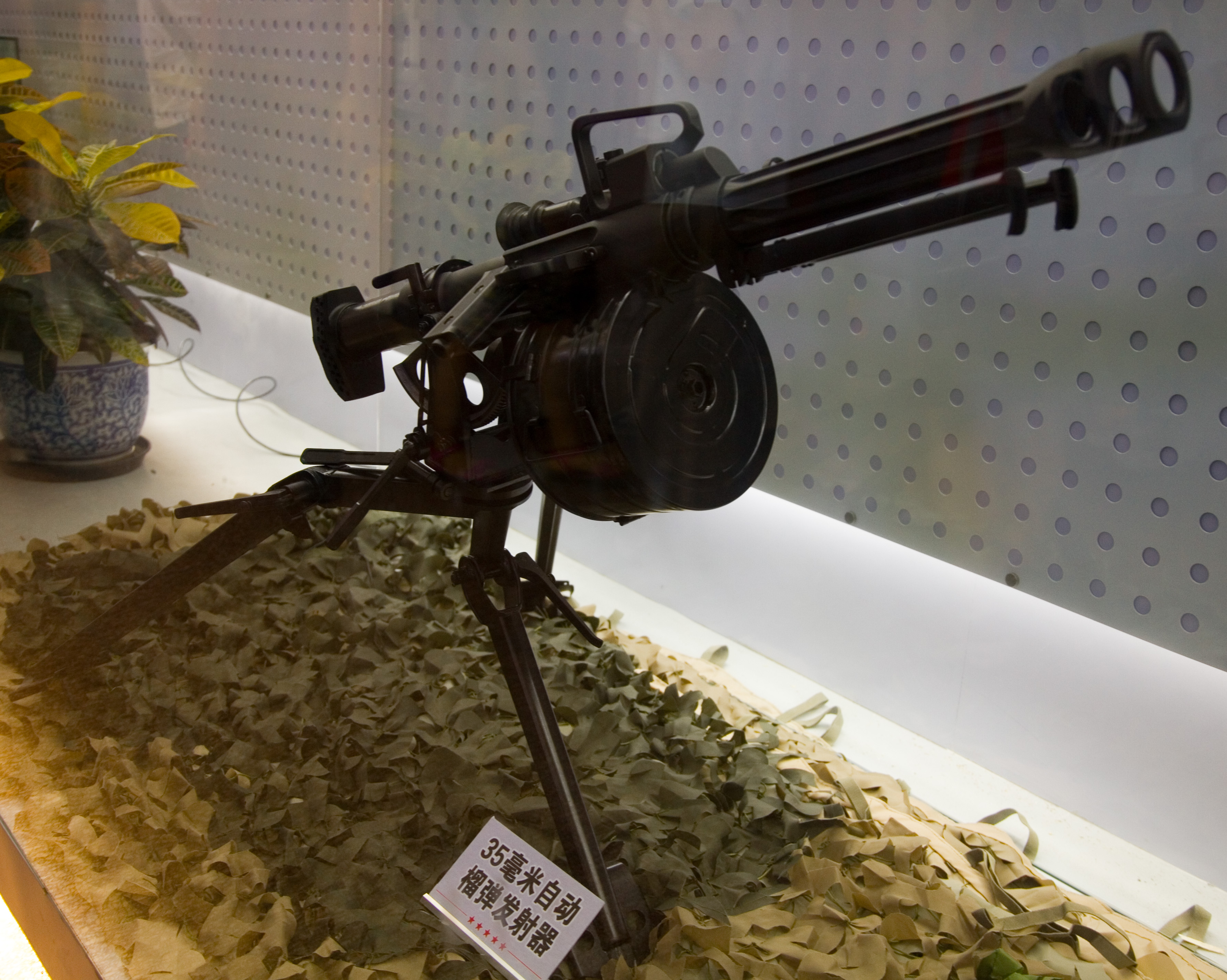
- A Type 87 grenade launcher mounted on a tripod on display in Beijing
- Type: Grenade launcher
- Place of origin: China

Service history
- Wars: Chadian Civil War (2005–2010); Sudanese conflict in South Kordofan and Blue Nile; Somali Civil War; Boko Haram insurgency; Syrian Civil War; Iraqi Civil War (2014–2017)

Production history
- Designer: Xianfeng Machinery
- Designed: 1982
- Manufacturer: Norinco
- Produced: Late 1980s – present

Specifications
- Mass: 26 lb (12 kg) (base: optical scope & integral bipod, no magazine); 44 lb (20 kg) (including tripod mount)
- Length: 38 in (970 mm)
- Cartridge: 35×32mmSR grenade
- Action: Air cooling, gas-operated (direct impingement)
- Rate of fire: 480 rounds/min
- Muzzle velocity: 190 m/s (620 ft/s)
- Effective firing range: 600 m (2,000 ft)
- Maximum firing range: 1,750 m (5,740 ft) (tripod-mounted)
- Feed system: 6- or 15-round drum magazine
- Sights: Iron sights 3x magnification optic Optic mounting rail for night vision or thermal sight

The QLZ-87 (also known as Type 87) is an air-cooled, gas operated 35×32mmSR automatic grenade launcher (AGL) that is crew transportable (12–20 kg (26–44 lb)) with limited amounts of ammunition. Unusual for handheld grenade launchers, the QLZ-87 fires high-velocity grenades of 35x32 mmSR caliber, which provides a longer range and flatter firing trajectory. It is the first ever indigenous automatic grenade launcher in China.

The QLZ-87 is being complemented by the QLZ-04, which is fed from a belt and thus is better suited to be mounted on tripods and vehicles.

== Development ==
The Chinese began attempting to develop an automatic grenade launcher in 1982 at the East China Institute of engineering (Now Nanjing University of Science and Technology), though development fell short after four years. In September 1986, the PLA General Staff Department began a procurement program for automatic grenade launchers, launching a contest between the East China Institute of Technology (Previously the East China Institute of Engineering) in joint with Factory 5316 (Now Zhejiang Xianfeng Machinery Limited), Factory 9449, Factory 925 and Factory 996 against a union of Hunan based military industries comprising Factory 9596 (Now Zijiang Machinery Factory), Factory 343, Factory 948 and Factory 9624.

The contract was won by the Hunan based military industries due to their contract being cheaper. Factory 9596 was in charge of developing the grenade launcher itself, Factory 343 was in charge of the anti-personnel ammunition, Factory 9624 was in charge of ammunition fuses, Factory 5618 developed the scope and Factory 9634 developed the primer. Meanwhile, the East China Institute of Technology, which lost the contract, began developing their own grenade launcher for foreign use, called the W87.

During trials of the grenade launcher made in Hunan during December of 1988, a cook-off happened due to inexperience of the factory workers. Due to this, the Hunan factories and East China Institute of Technology decided to merge their projects and began jointly developing the QLZ-87 in 1990.

The QLZ-87 entered service in February 1996, and was first seen publicly in 1997 in use with the HK garrison.

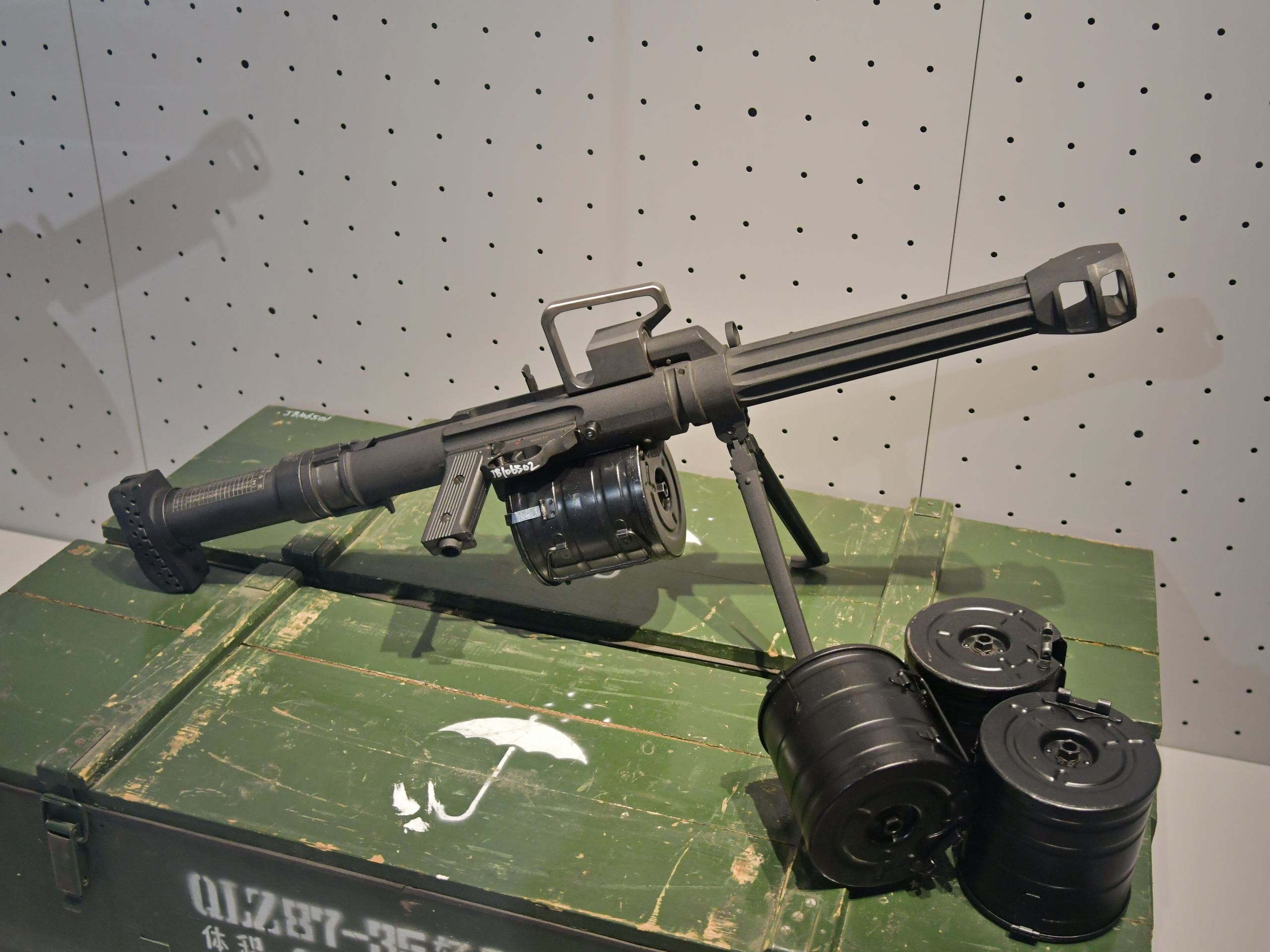
QLZ-87 in bipod configuration

== Design ==
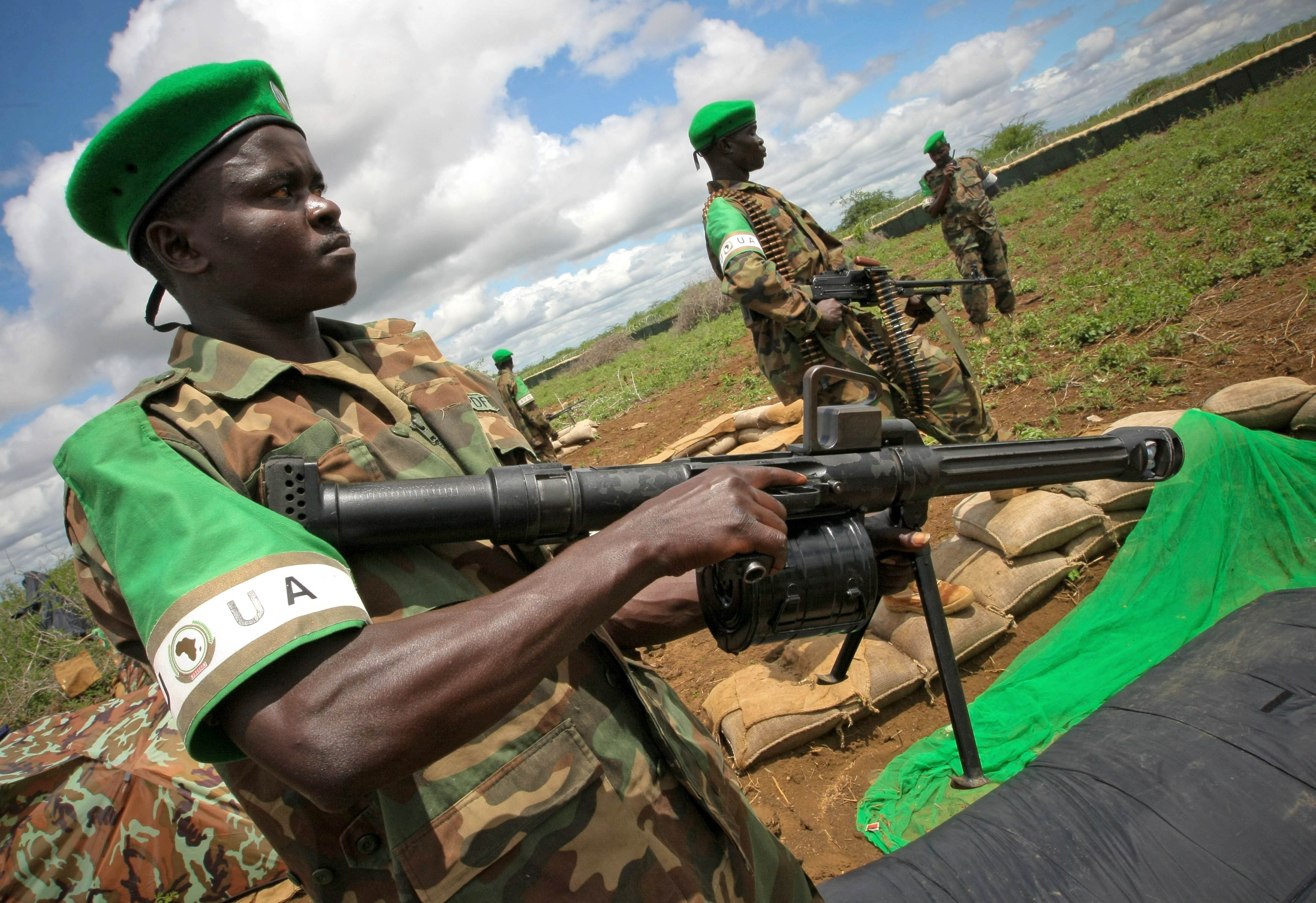
QLZ-87 carried by Ugandan soldiers on the African Union mission

It can fire a variety of 35 mm grenades stored in the 6-or 15-round cartridge drum. The Type 87 is described by NORINCO as "Mini Infantry Artillery". The two most common types of grenades are the 35x32SR DFS87 HE (High Explosive) and DFJ87 HEDP (High Explosive, Dual Purpose) variants. The HEDP 35 mm grenade pierces armour up to 80 mm thick and produces fragments to kill or wound personnel within 5 meters of the point of impact. The HE 35mm grenade has a stated fragmentation casualty radius of 10–11 meters. The Type 87 can fire on a tripod or by using the bipod fixed on the barrel. It can also be mounted on armored vehicles or helicopters. The launcher is capable of attacking low-flying air targets as well as targets on the ground.

=== Ammunition ===
The list of warhead types that are available for the 35×32mmSR Type 87:

- DFS-87 (Chinese: DFS-87杀伤弹): Anti-personnel fragmentation grenade with HE-Frag warhead.
- DFJ-87 (Chinese: DFJ-87破甲杀伤弹): Dual purpose, Armor-piercing grenade with HEAT warhead.
- DFR-87 (Chinese: DFR-87燃烧弹): Incendiary grenade.
- DFN-87 (Chinese: DFN-87杀伤燃烧弹): High-explosive fragmentation incendiary grenade.
- DFD-87 (Chinese: DFD-87烟雾弹): Smoke/marker grenade, with colored smoke.

== Variants ==
- QLZ-87B/QLB-06: A newer handheld semi-automatic version of the QLZ-87. It features an aluminum receiver, redesigned action, new bipod, no tripod mount, and a conventional pistol grip and fire control. Weight is reduced to 9.1 kg (20 lb) and it is fed by a 4-round drum.

== Users ==
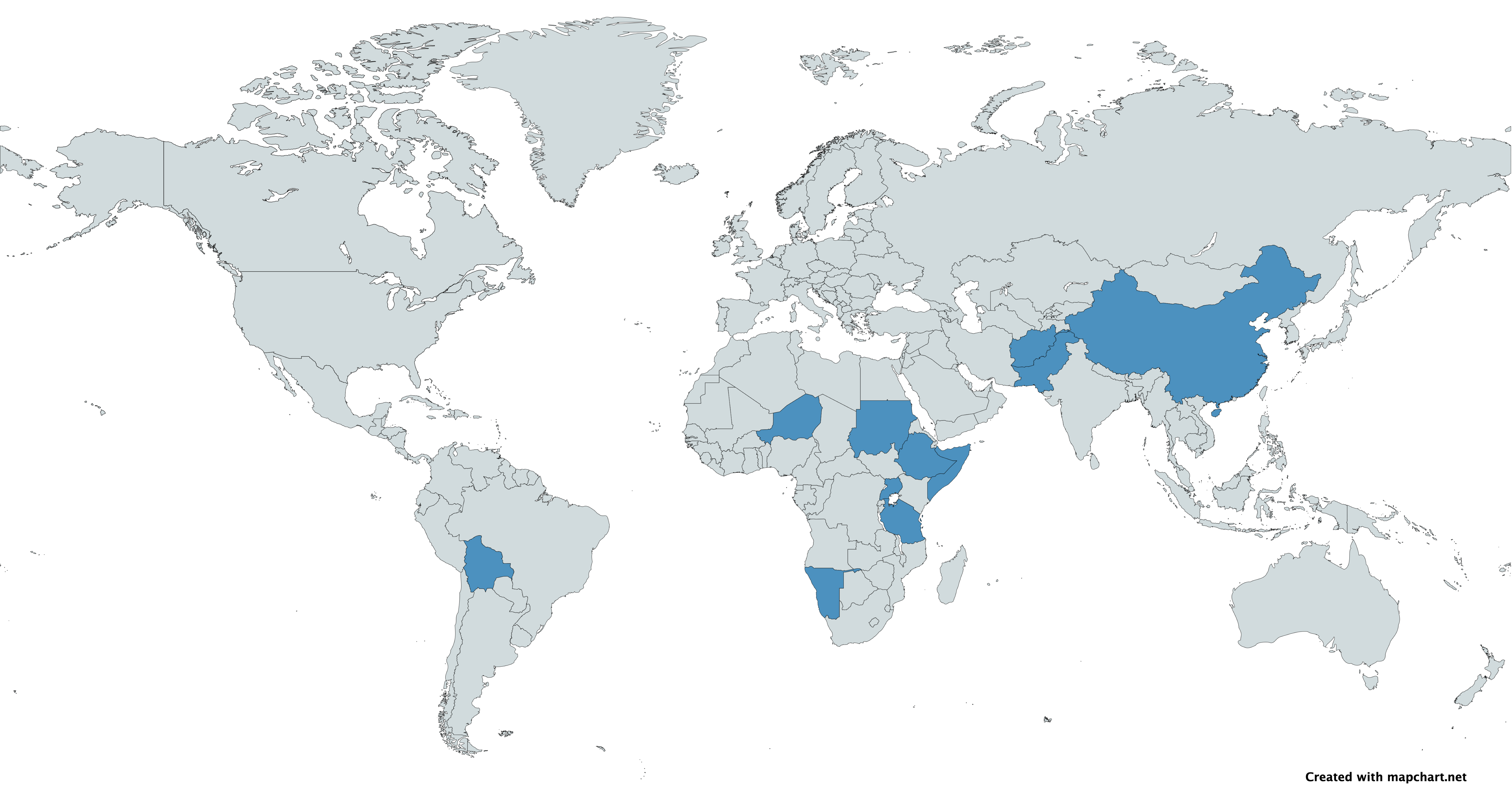
Map with QLZ-87 users in blue

- Afghanistan
- Bolivia
- China: People's Liberation Army Hong Kong garrison
- Ethiopia: Some are locally made.
- Iraqi Kurdistan: Kurdish Peshmerga
- Namibia
- Niger
- Pakistan: Used by Pakistan Army.
- Somalia: Some captured by the Shabaab.
- Sudan: Known to be made as "ABBA" by MIC. The QLZ-87 is also used by Sudan-backed Chadian rebels and the Sudan People's Liberation Movement-North.
- Tanzania
- Uganda

=== Non-State Actors ===
- Hamas: Some allegedly seized from Hamas arms caches.
- Syrian National Coalition

== See also ==
- QLZ-04
- QLU-11, the replacement of the QLZ-87
- Type 91 grenade launcher
- Comparison of automatic grenade launchers

International:

- Milkor MGL – (South Africa)
- Neopup PAW-20 – (South Africa)
- Mk 19 grenade launcher – (United States)
- Mk 47 Mod 0 Striker – (United States)
- AGS-17 – (Soviet Union)
- AGS-30 – (Russia)

== Sources ==
- Yan, Timothy (August 2014). The Chinese QLZ87 Automatic Grenade Launcher (PDF). Arms & Munitions Brief 1. Armament Research Services Pty. Ltd. ISBN 9780992462420.
