= QBZ-95 =

Chinese bullpup assault rifle

Type 95 automatic rifle
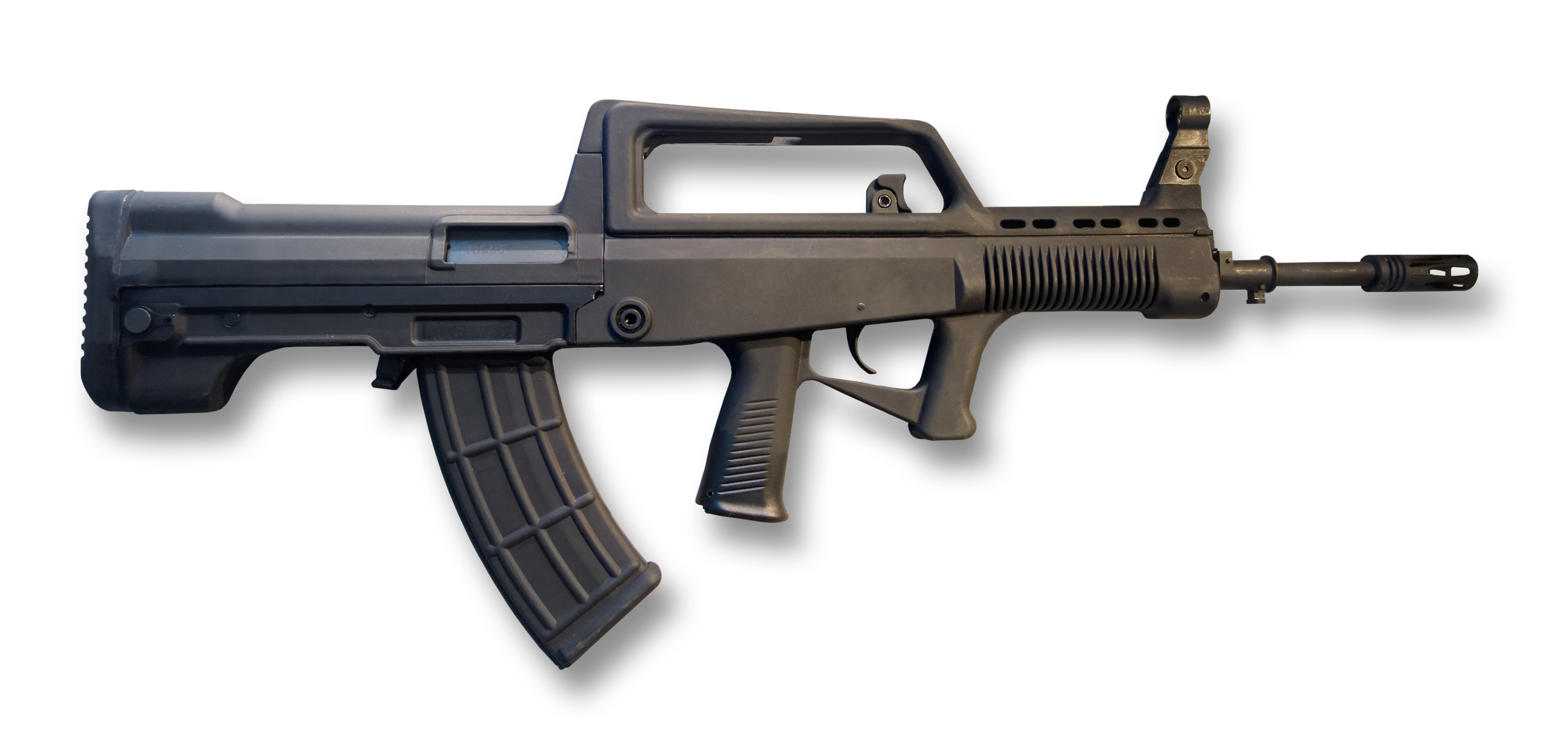
- The QBZ-95
- Type: Bullpup assault rifle Carbine (QBZ-95B, QBZ-97B, QBZ-95B-1); Light support weapon (QJB-95, QJB-97, QJB-95-1); Shotgun (K12 PUMA)
- Place of origin: China

Service history
- In service: 1997–present
- Used by: See Users
- Wars: Sri Lankan Civil War; South Sudanese Civil War; War in Afghanistan; Insurgency in Khyber Pakhtunkhwa; Myanmar conflict; Myanmar Civil War; Xinjiang conflict; 2025 Cambodia‒Thailand conflict

Production history
- Designer: Duo Yingxian
- Designed: 1989–1991
- Manufacturer: Norinco
- Unit cost: 4,300 Yuan (2014 cost to equip one PLA soldier)
- Produced: 1995–present
- No. built: 3,000,000
- Variants: See Variants

Specifications
- Mass: 3.4 kg (7.5 lb)
- Length: 760 mm (30 in)
- Barrel length: 463 mm (18.2 in)
- Cartridge: 5.8×42mm DBP87
- Action: Short-stroke piston, rotating bolt
- Rate of fire: 650 rounds/min
- Muzzle velocity: 930 m/s (3,050 ft/s)
- Effective firing range: 400 m (1,300 ft) point target, 600–800 m (2,000–2,600 ft) area target
- Feed system: 30-round detachable box magazine 75-round detachable drum
- Sights: Hooded post front sight and aperture rear sight Y/MA95 (3x); Y/MA95-1 (3x); QMK-152 (3x); QMK-171 (3x); IR5118 thermal scope (1x)

The Type 95 automatic rifle (Chinese: 95式自动步枪; pinyin: 95 Shì zìdòng bùqiāng) or QBZ-95 (Note: The rifle's designation "QBZ" stands for "'light weapon' (qing wuqi; 轻武器)—'rifle' (buqiang; 步枪)—'automatic' (zidong; 自动)", in keeping with the coding standards of the Chinese defense industry.) is a bullpup assault rifle designed and manufactured by Norinco, and issued since 1995 as the service rifle for the People's Liberation Army, People's Armed Police, and various law enforcement agencies in the People's Republic of China.

== Development ==
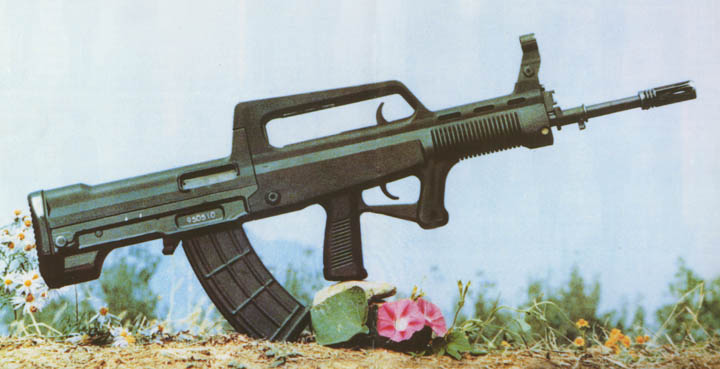
The QBZ-95

The Chinese military started to develop small-caliber weapons in 1971. The Type 87, a modification based on the Type 81 assault rifle, was developed in the 1980s and entered limited service in 1987.

The Chinese military continued to search for a new small-caliber design after Type 87. Bullpup configurations were also experimented with in the early 1980s, resulting in the WTC-1 and WTC-2 bullpup prototypes in 1983 and the Type 86 bullpup rifle in 1986.

In 1989, the People's Liberation Army requested that Norinco develop a new family of small-caliber firearms with improved reliability and accuracy, adaptability to different roles, and configurability to different tactical applications. The rifle was subcontracted to Norinco's Arsenal 266 and Jianshe Corporation's Arsenal 296.

Duo Yingxian, who is credited for the design of QBZ-95, was recruited to serve as the project head in 1991. He was given four years for the development. Two years were spent on the design, alongside two years of field tests. Initial production started in 1995.

The QBZ-95 was first observed in public on 1 July 1997, when the United Kingdom returned sovereignty of Hong Kong to China. It is a modern weapon system in a bullpup configuration, where the weapon's action and magazine are located behind the grip and trigger assembly. The weapon was designed to replace the standard-issue Type 81 assault rifle. The QBZ-95 had replaced the Type 81 in frontline units by 2006, and is gradually replacing it in second-line units and the People's Armed Police. In 2007 the Royal Cambodian Army became the first confirmed foreign user of the QBZ-95 rifle.

An improved version called the "QBZ-95-1" was first seen undergoing trials in early 2010. The first formal public display of the improved version was with the Hong Kong Garrison, the first unit to receive the original QBZ-95, in a military parade in July 2012. Some improvements were ergonomic, with the safety switch moved to above the pistol grip and the right-sided ejection port moved forward with ejection of cartridges at an angle to allow left-handed firing. Unlike previous DBP87 and DBP85 5.8×42mm rounds, it fires better-quality DBP10 ammunition with non-corrosive primers, clean-burning propellant, and copper-coated steel casings with copper-alloy-jacketed hardened steel-cored bullets.

The QBZ-95-1 has a longer, heavier barrel and redesigned muzzle brake, a diamond-shaped cross-section on the handguard to disperse heat, a stronger buttstock and a redesigned trigger guard. The carrying handle was lowered to better position optics on the quick-releasable modified dovetail rail, and a pair of short rails at the sight's base allows for tactical accessories to be mounted. Some Chinese special forces have been seen equipped with customized QBZ-95-1 rifle variants.

== Design details ==
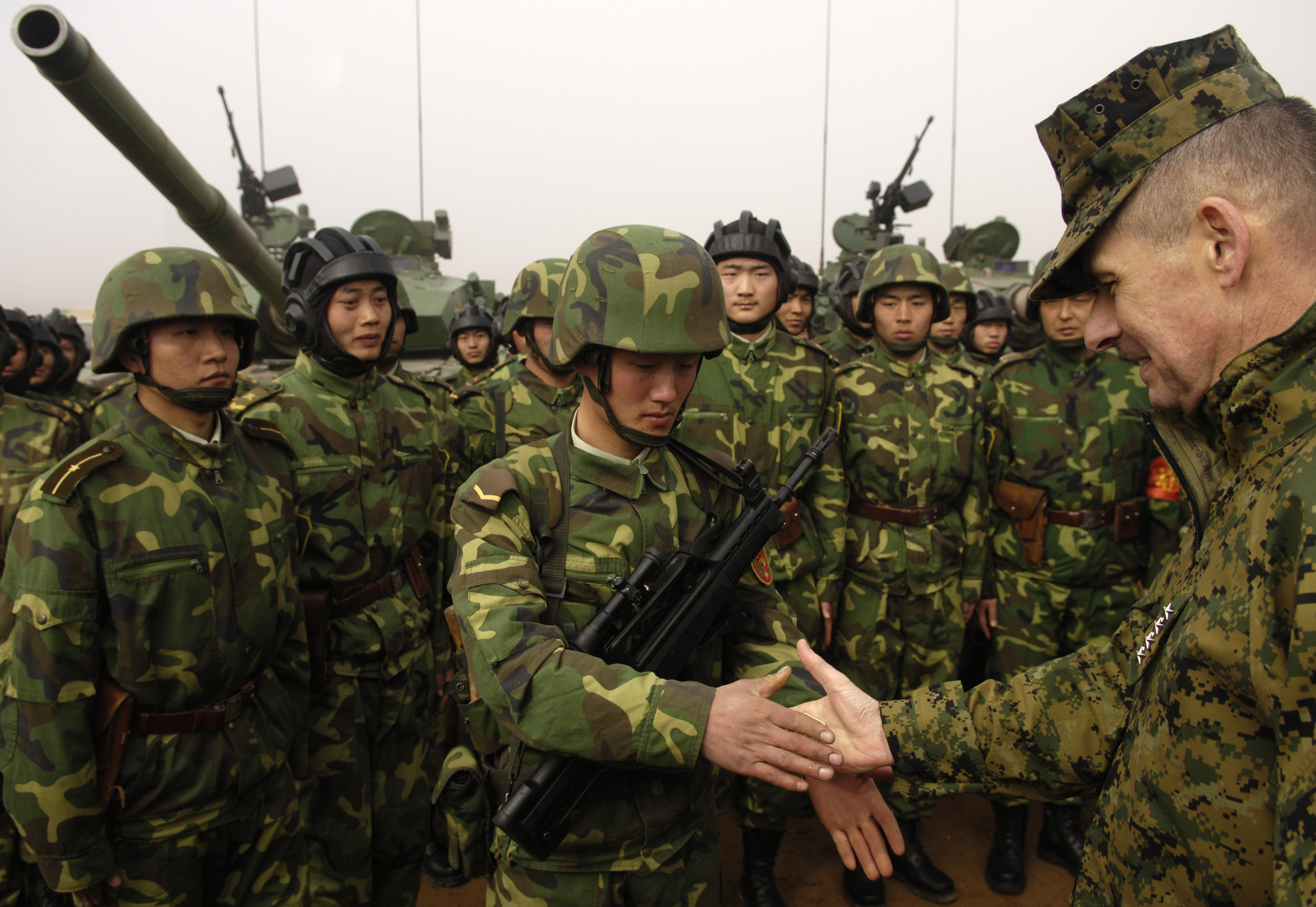
Chairman of the Joint Chiefs of Staff General Peter Pace USMC shakes hands with a Chinese tank crew member who holds a QBZ-95

The QBZ-95 features a short-stroke gas operated rotating-bolt system and uses polymer materials in its construction, chambered in 5.8×42mm caliber, (in a class with the NATO standard 5.56×45mm SS109 and the Russian 5.45×39mm), and employs a bullpup configuration similar to the British SA80, French FAMAS, Austrian Steyr AUG, South African Vektor CR-21, Israeli Tavor and the Singaporean SAR-21.

The selector switch on the QBZ-95 has four settings. The selector settings are as follows: "0" for safe, "1" for semi-automatic, "2" for fully automatic and, on selected models, "3" for a three-round burst setting.

The Chinese Army says it has tested its 5.8×42mm cartridge extensively against NATO's 5.56×45mm and its counterpart, the 5.45×39mm from Russia. The PLA claims their cartridge outperforms both with flatter trajectories, and higher retention of velocities and energy downrange. It is also claimed to have a penetration superior to the 5.56×45mm NATO.

=== Ammunition ===
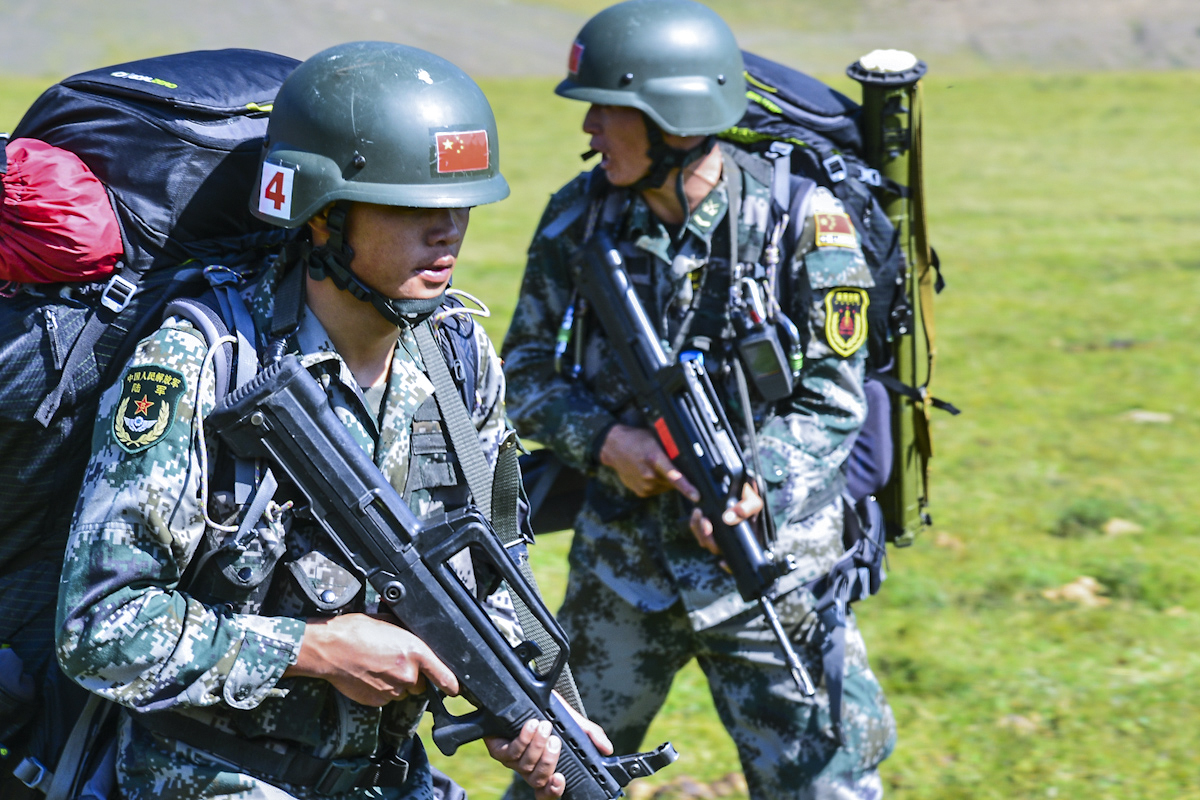
Two PLAGF soldiers with their QBZ-95s march through mountainous terrain, during Elbrus Ring international competition

The QBZ-95 fires the 5.8×42mm DBP87, an indigenous intermediate cartridge.

The design of the QBZ-95 is completely new with little resemblance to any of the previous Chinese designs. Thanks to the low recoil impulse of the small caliber ammunition and a recoil buffer system, the rifle is claimed to be more controllable in automatic fire. The aim was to develop an assault rifle based around the 5.8×42mm round, with specifications of being accurate and reliable.

=== Magazine ===
Magazines are inserted into the magazine well, which is located to the rear of the pistol grip. The magazine is inserted front-first into the well so that the notch on the front of the magazine is retained in the well. The magazine is then "rocked" into place by rotating the rear of the magazine upwards into the well (in a manner similar to the AK-47 series) until the magazine latch to the rear of the well is engaged. To release the magazine, the magazine release is pressed rearward, and the magazine pivoted forward and disengaged from the front recess.

=== Firing mechanism ===
The QBZ-95 uses a linear striker-firing mechanism, where a spring-loaded firing pin and linear hammer fires the chambered cartridge; most post-World War II military rifles use a rotating hammer firing mechanism. The firing mechanism and trigger are inspired by the vz. 58, but with noticeable differences. The QBZ-95's striker piece has a more complex shape. Furthermore, the QBZ-95 uses in-line main and striker springs using the same spring guide rod, instead of two parallel springs.

The charging handle is located under the integral carrying handle, similar to early versions of the AR-10. To chamber a round and charge the weapon, the handle is pulled fully to the rear and then released forward to bring a round into the chamber. It is then ready to fire. On the later variants, if the bolt is held open, the charging handle will be locked in the rear position under the carrying handle. One can either use the finger to pull the charging handle to the rear fully or press the bolt release button located behind the magazine latch to release the bolt, one feature the previous design lacks.

=== Ergonomics ===
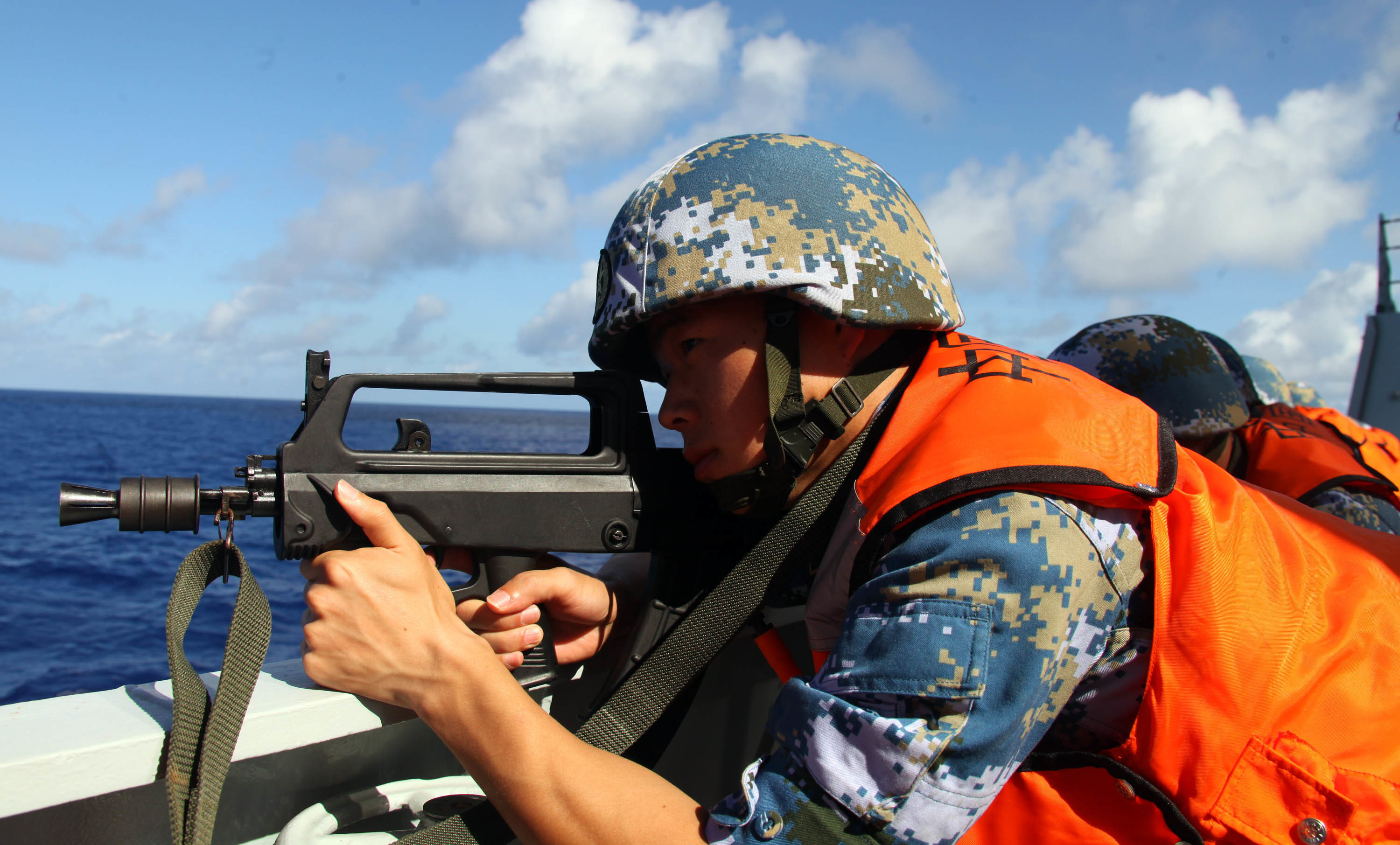
Chinese sailor holding a QBZ-95B short-barrel carbine during a VBSS exercise at RIMPAC

Some experts are concerned over the awkward position of the safety lever near the end of the rifle away from the shooter's hand. This position makes it difficult to quickly select "fire" when it is in "safe" mode. This is resolved on the "G" (Gai, 改; literally: 'modified') variant (QBZ-95-1) where the fire selector switch is repositioned above the pistol grip, giving it a thumb fire selector switch for easy firing mode transition.

The QBZ-95-1 has a redesigned recoil buffer and reportedly feels gentler when fired.

=== Grenade launchers ===
The QBZ-95 can launch rifle grenades from the barrel using blank ammunition. It can also mount the QLG-91B (Type 91B) under-barrel grenade launcher. This 35 mm launcher weighs 1.45 kg (3.2 lb) and is 310 mm (12 in) long. It loads from the breech and fires grenades at 75 m/s (250 ft/s). Various lethal and non-lethal rounds are available including high explosive, tear gas, and illumination.

Other options include the QLG-10 and QLG-10A 35 mm grenade launchers, which both can be mounted on the QBZ-95-1, QBZ-95-1, and QBZ-95B-1. The QLG-10/A is the same length and weighs the same as the QLG91B, but differs in that it fires caseless ammunition. It is modeled after the Russian GP-25 and fires DFS-10 grenades. The DFS-10 has the same caseless design as the Russian VOG-25 where the base of the round is the propellant and nothing is left in the barrel after firing. The QLG10A launcher is loaded from its muzzle and the shell has pre-engraved rifling for added stabilization. It is aimed with iron sights mounted to the left above the barrel, but a red dot sight can be installed over the sight base.

The DFS-10 round weighs 169 g (6.0 oz), has a velocity of 78 m/s (260 ft/s), and has an effective range of 430 m (1,410 ft). Warheads include high explosive fragmentation, high explosive dual-purpose, inert practice, and less-lethal riot control versions.

=== Bayonet ===
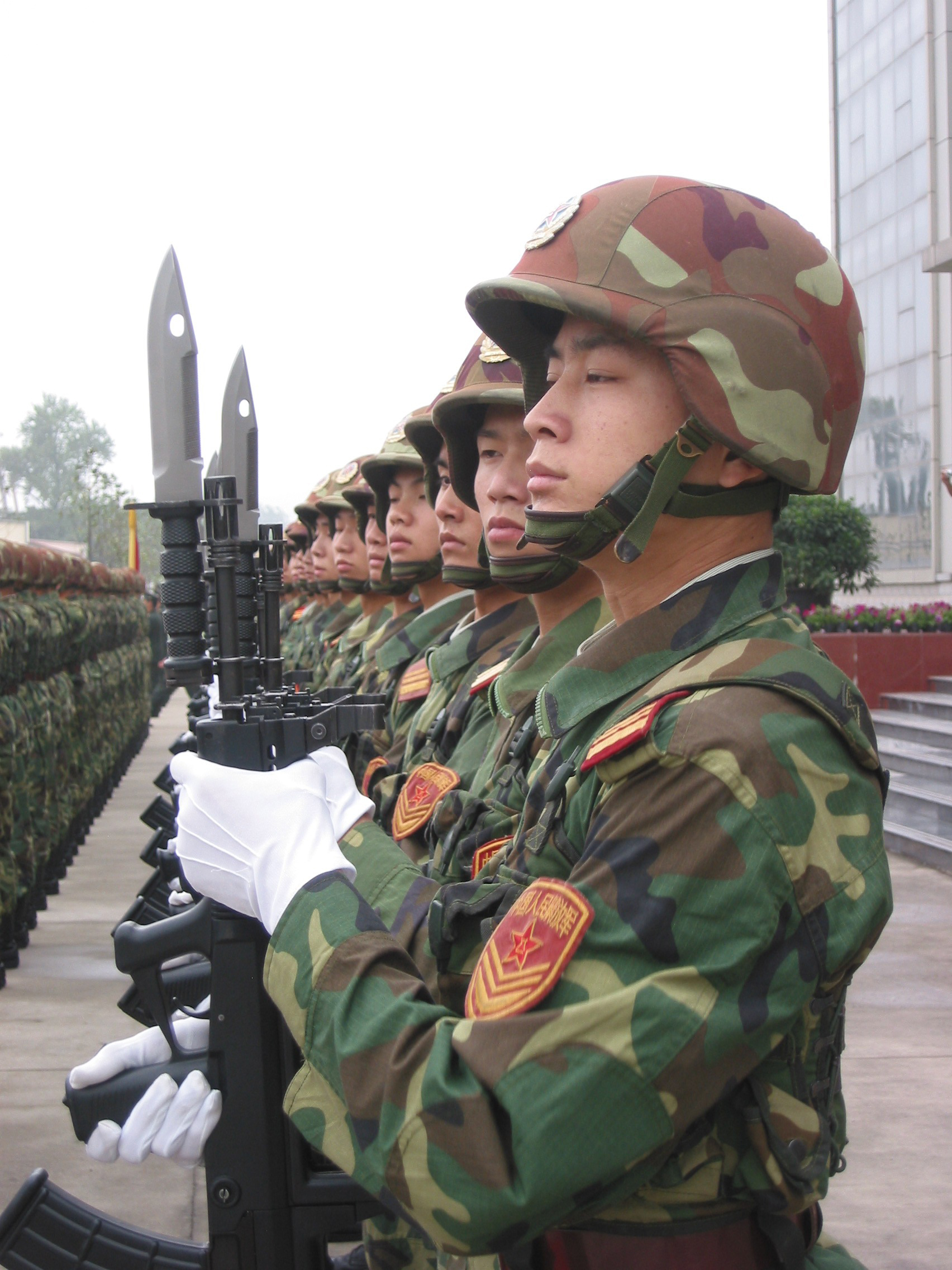
Soldiers of a PLA honor guard in Nanjing, presenting QBZ-95s with bayonets fixed, 2009

The QBZ-95 can be mounted with the QNL-95 bayonet, which is based on the M9 bayonet.

=== Sights ===
The QBZ-95 can mount various optical sights due to a dovetail rail built into the carrying handle. It can also use YMA95 and YMA95-1 scopes.

QBZ-95 and QBZ-95–1 series rifles can also be fitted with improved QMK-171 3x scopes. The QMK-171 shares the same design as the QMK-152 scope fitted with the QBZ-191, though the QMK-152 only fits on picatinny rails, whereas the QMK-171 has quick-lock lever for dovetail rails.

=== Picatinny rail ===
The carrying handle can be mounted with a short picatinny rail, as well as be swapped to new upper receiver with customization capabilities.

Most of the picatinny rail modifications for the Type 95 were designed by Wang Jie (Chinese: 王杰) and Hong Kong weapon designer Lee Ka Ho (Chinese: 李家豪).

The ACP Peak series by Lee has a flat-top rail system while "Long Bow" (Chinese: 长弓) modifications from Wang Jie retain the shape of the carrying handle. Both modifications are fielded within the Chinese police force and People's Liberation Army.

== Variants ==
The QBZ-95 is the flagship of the Type 95 gun family (95式枪族), a family of firearms sharing a common receiver design, which includes a standard rifle, a carbine and squad automatic weapon (SAW) variants.

=== Military variants ===
==== QBZ-95 ====
This is the Chinese standard-issue version of the rifle, chambered for the 5.8×42mm DBP87 round.

Due to issues associated with the original design, the PLA began a program to improve the Type 95.

Lead designer Duo Yingxian (朵英贤), now retired, stated that the project was currently in progress by some of his students.

The goals for the Type 95 upgrade program include the following:

- To improve the rifle's ergonomics and fire controls
- To chamber the rifle for a new type of ammunition with double the effective range
- To add a quick-firing, domestically produced grenade launcher

The upgrade program resulted in the improved QBZ-95-1 variant.

==== QBZ-95B ====
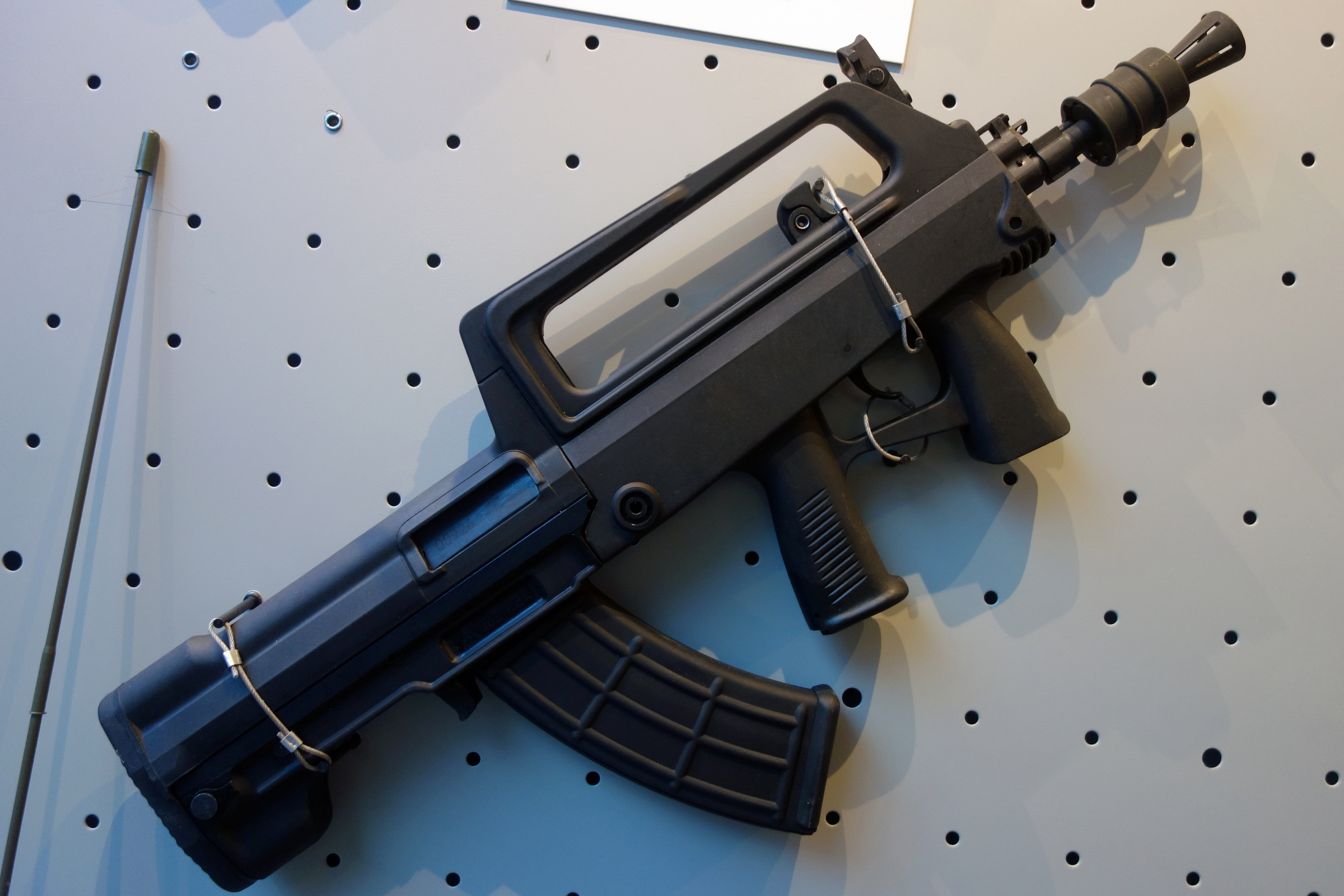
A QBZ-95B carbine

The QBZ-95B is a shorter and lighter carbine version of the standard rifle. The QBZ-95B is seen issued to members of the Chinese navy, as its compact size is better suited for the confined spaces aboard ships. Its shorter barrel prevents a grenade launcher or bayonet from being attached, and it has an AKS-74U style muzzle booster.

The carbine may also be in use with special forces. It lacks a forend and instead has a foregrip, with the front iron sight built into the carrying handle.

==== QJB-95 LSW ====
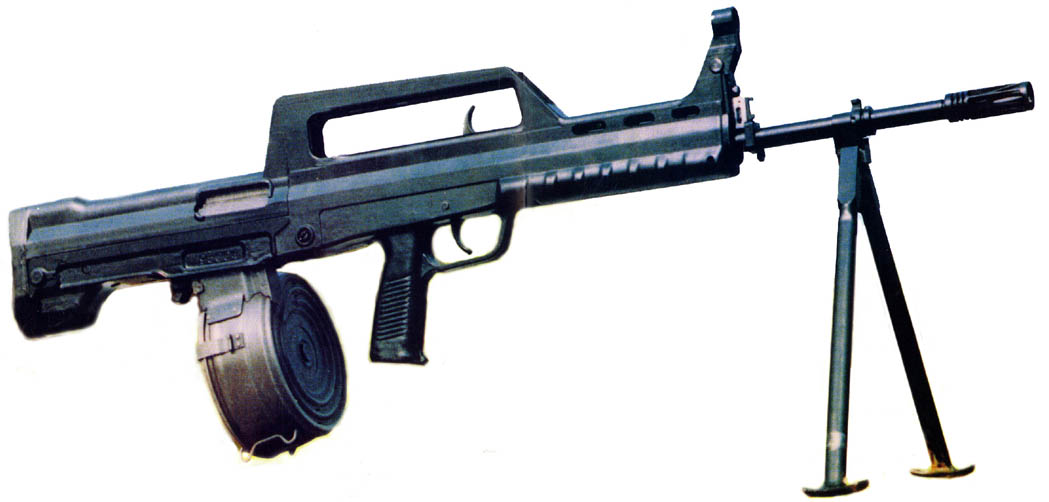
A QJB-95 LSW with a drum magazine and bipod

The QJB-95 is the squad automatic weapon variant of the QBZ-95. The designation "QJB" stands for "Qingwuqi, Jiqiang, Banyong", which means 'light weapon/small arm, machine gun, squad-use'. It was previously designated as the QBB-95. It has an added bipod, a longer, heavier barrel and a 75 or 80-round drum magazine to allow sustained fire, however, the standard 30-round box magazine is also compatible.

Although the QJB-95 and QBZ-95 both take the standard 5.8×42mm DBP87 round, the QJB-95 typically uses the 5.8x42mm DBP88 "heavy round" squad automatic weapon and designated marksman rifle cartridges, which have longer, deeper armor penetration and greater ballistics' capabilities at long range. As using the heavy rounds in a QBZ-95 would greatly wear the barrel in action, normal cartridges are used in QBZ-95 rifles.

However, with the fielding of the QBZ-95-1 variant, newer and heavier DBP10 cartridges are planned to become the standard ammunition for both weapons.

==== QBZ-97 ====
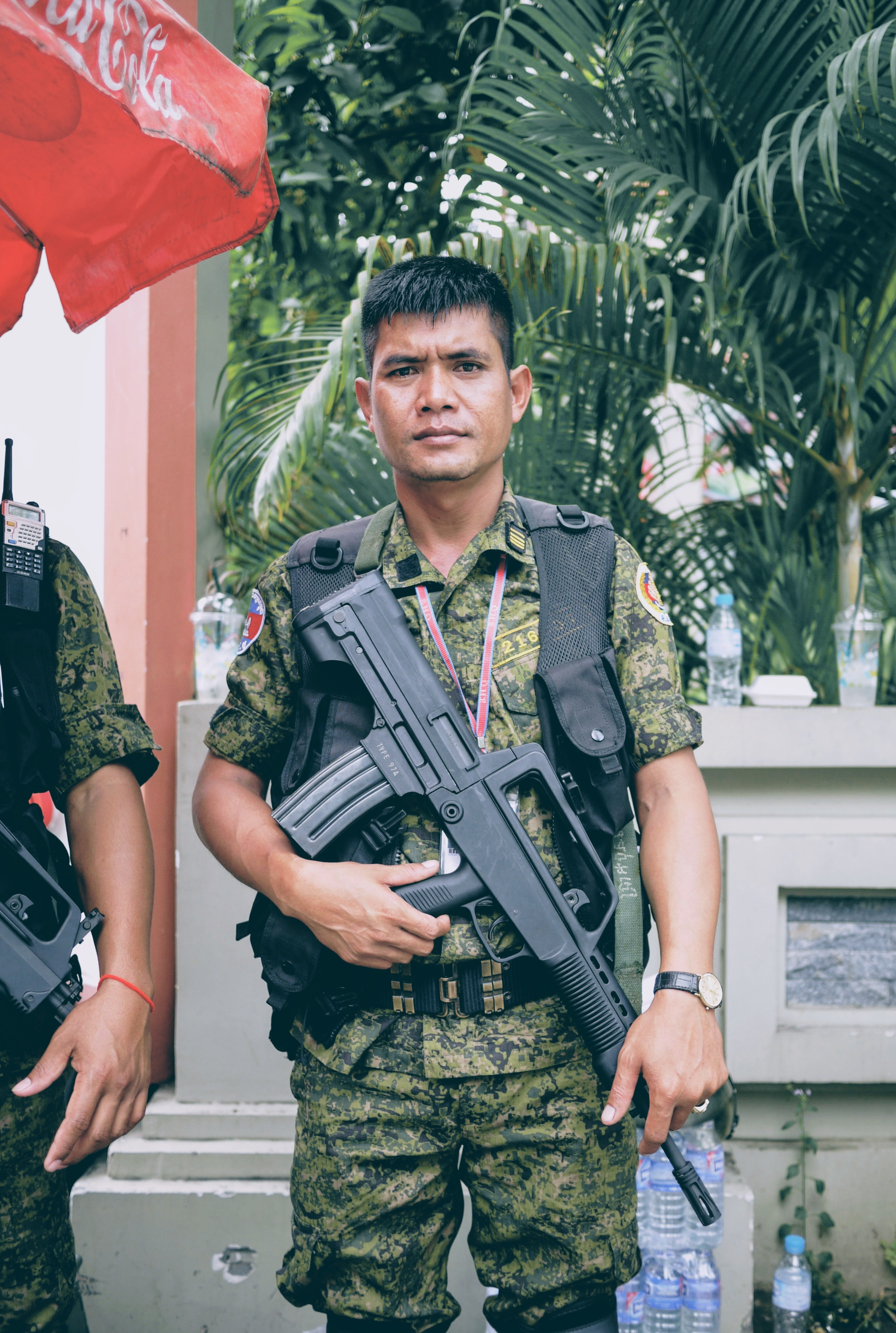
A soldier from the Cambodian Prime Minister's Bodyguard Unit equipped with QBZ-97

The QBZ-97 is an export variant similar to the QBZ-95 in all respects, except that it is chambered for 5.56×45mm NATO ammunition and has a deep magazine well designed to accept a proprietary magazine.

AR-15 pattern magazines can technically be loaded, but, depending on the model, this can cause FTF malfunctions and can get stuck.

The QBZ-97 is used by various countries in Southeast Asia, South Asia and East Africa. It is also currently used by Ginghis Security Academy, a Chinese private security group, supplementing their QBZ-95s.

There have been hints of the QBZ-97 variants being involved in some foreign conflicts. Little has been reported about its overall combat effectiveness. It has been shown in televised tests that the weapon can continue to function after being immersed in water, as well as other harsh environmental conditions.

==== QBZ-97A ====
This variant is a QBZ-97 with the addition of a three-round burst mode and a bolt hold-open device; it also differs from the QBZ-95 and the QBZ-97 by the shape of its grip, now missing the "front grip" part in front of the trigger guard.

==== QBZ-97B ====
This is the carbine variant of the QBZ-97. The official distributor of the QBZ-97B assault carbine on the international market, Jianshe Industries (Group) Corporation, advertises and sells it under the denomination "5.56mm short automatic rifle Type NQZ03B (97)".

==== QJB-97 LSW ====
The light support weapon model of the QBZ-97 is chambered for 5.56×45mm NATO ammo.

==== QBZ-95-1 ====
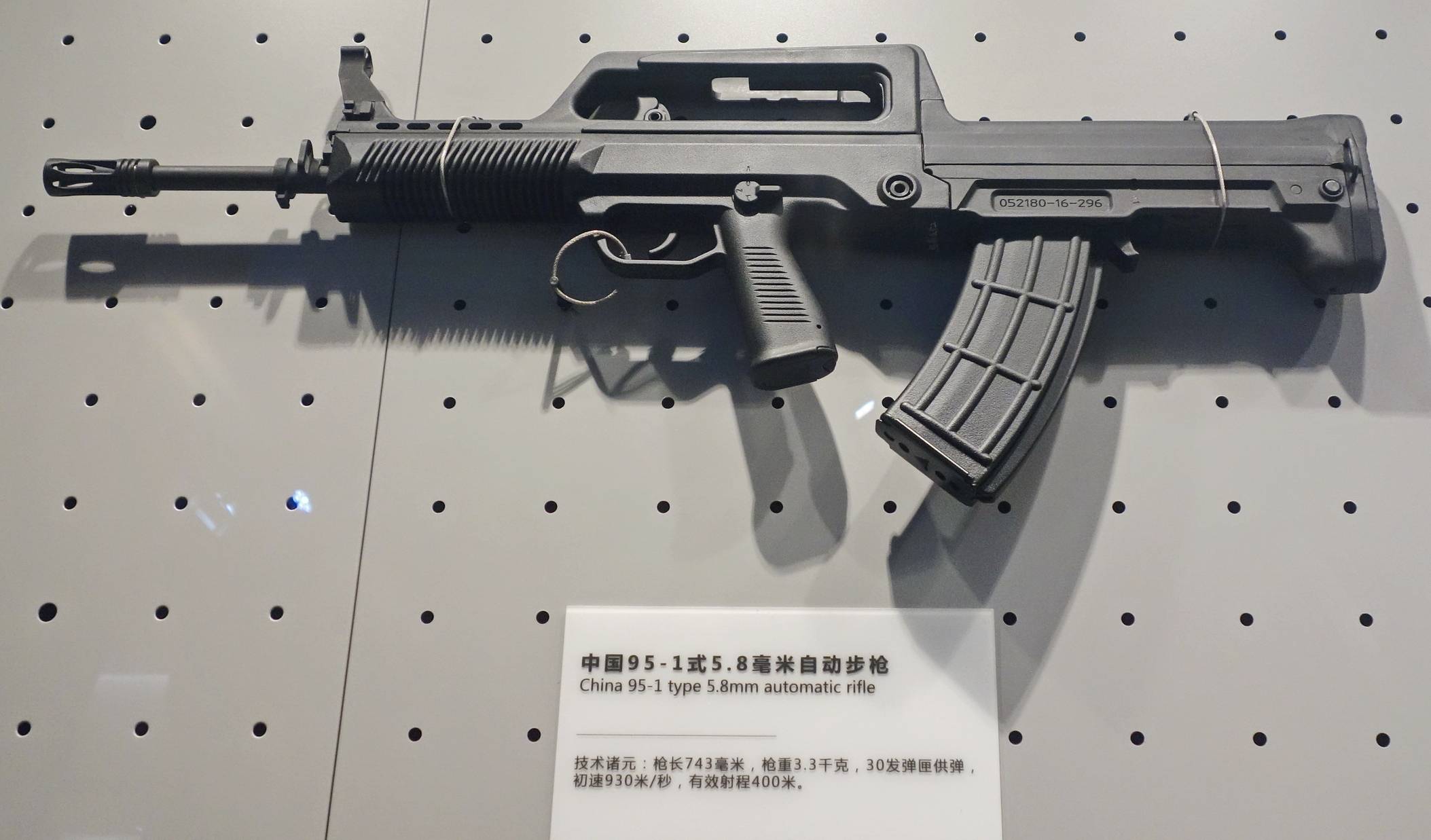
QBZ-95-1 automatic rifle

The QBZ-95-1, also called the QBZ-95 "Gai" ("改"; literally: 'modified'), addresses several reliability and ease-of-use issues, and has improved ergonomics. The QBZ-95 variant titled "1" fires the heavier 5.8×42mm DBP10 round, and has a heavier, longer barrel and a redesigned muzzle brake to use it.

The "1" variant has an altered butt stock, trigger guard, and a repositioned thumb fire selector switch above the pistol grip. The carry handle has retained the Chinese quick release mount rail. In addition, cartridge casings eject to the front (1 o'clock position from the barrel) of the weapon, allowing left-handed firing.

The bolt release button located behind the magazine latch. It was observed undergoing testing and evaluation in early 2010.

It was later introduced into service, replacing the original QBZ-95 assault rifle. The original QBZ-95 rifles are being handed down to second line and reserve troops, while front line troops receive the QBZ-95-1.

The QBZ-95-1 is scheduled to be replaced in the near future by the QBZ-191.

==== QBZ-95B-1 ====
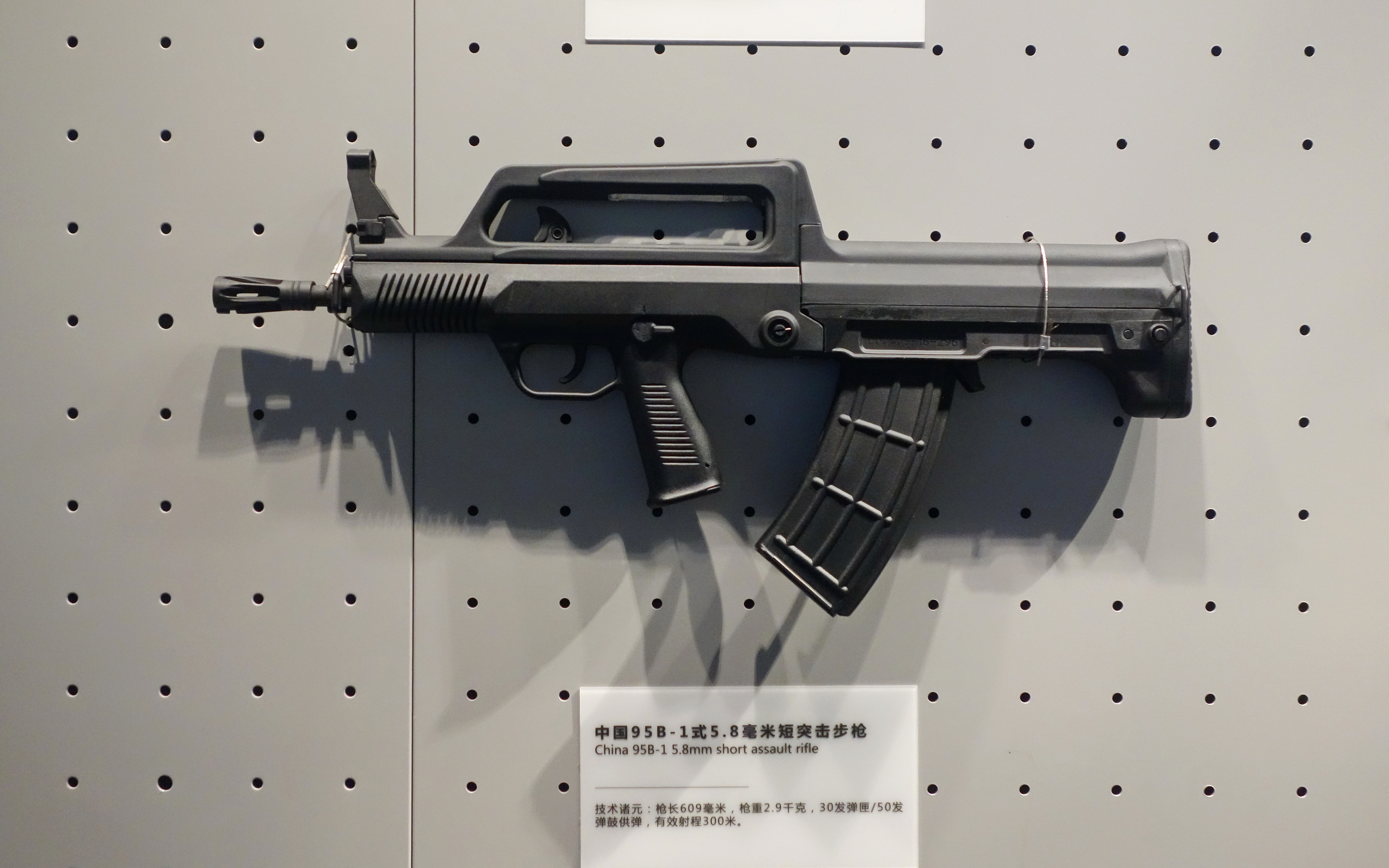
QBZ-95B-1 carbine

Improved version of the QBZ-95B with barrel and ergonomic enhancements of the QBZ-95-1 in the carbine platform.

==== QJB-95-1 LSW ====
An improved version of the QJB-95 LSW with the ergonomic enhancements of the QBZ-95-1 in a squad machine gun platform.

=== Civilian variants ===
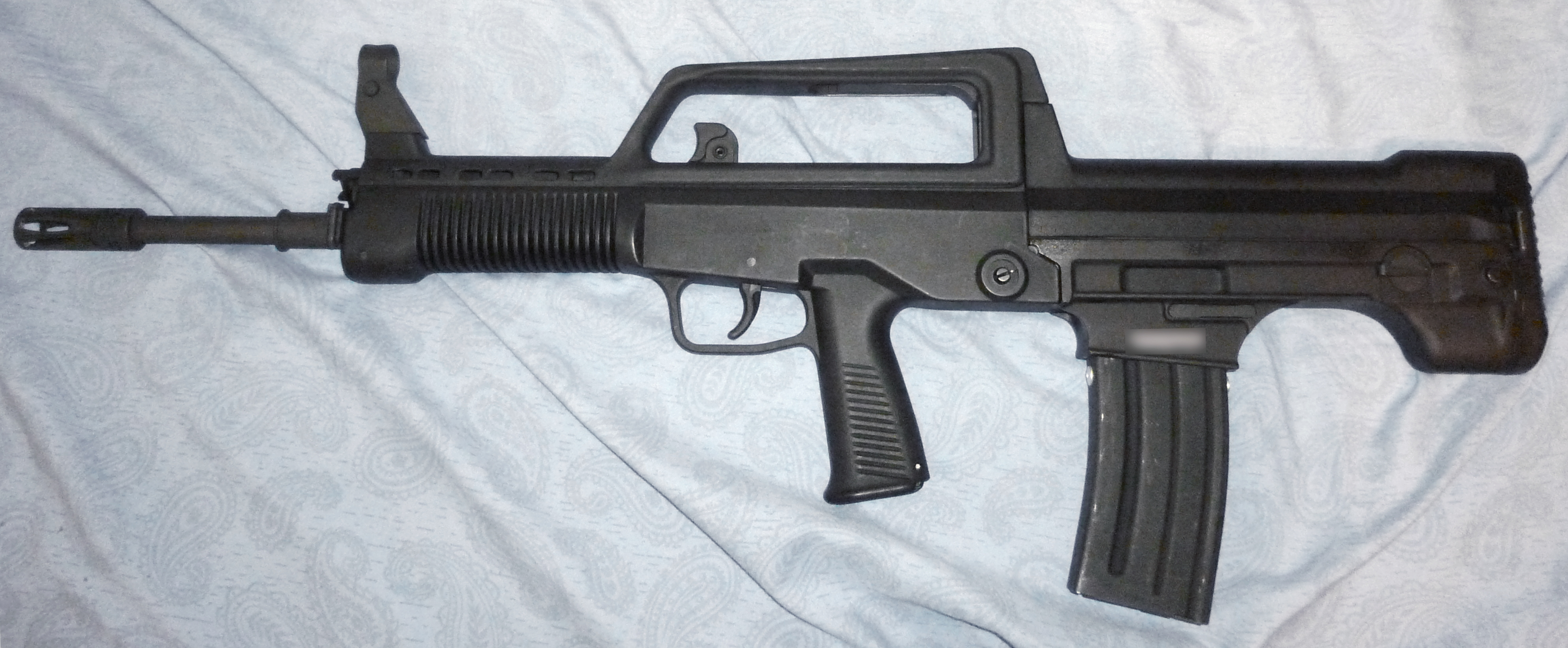
T97NSR made by Jianshe Industries under the Emei brand for the Canadian civilian market

Two sporterized, semi-automatic-only rifles based upon the QBZ-97A assault rifle and the QBZ-97B assault carbine have been developed for the civilian market, the Type 97 rifle and the Type 97A carbine. They are chambered for the .223 Remington and 5.56mm cartridge and are fed by STANAG magazines.

Type 97A carbines became available in Canada in 2008, were classified as "non-restricted" by the Royal Canadian Mounted Police (RCMP), and sold to the general public. In January 2009, a shipment of Type 97 firearms was approved by the RCMP for retail sale, but was later confiscated and seized by Canada Border Services Agency (CBSA) officers. Around the same time, a second shipment of Type 97A restricted firearms was also stopped by the CBSA. On March 22, 2010, about 35 civilian owners of Type 97A carbines originally imported by Lever Arms of BC (the only version ever available for sale) were sent notice by the RCMP indicating that the status of their firearm had been changed to "12.2 prohibited (fully automatic)", and owners without such a firearm license had 30 days to turn in their Type 97A firearms to either individuals or businesses that had such a license, or to police for destruction. Canadian Type-97 owners initiated a reference hearing, to establish legality of re-classification of the Type-97 semi-automatic weapon to "prohibited" status. In early 2012 the challenge was lost, and the judge ruled that Type-97 firearms are, indeed, prohibited firearms. While the exact details of the modification are kept secret, RCMP firearm technicians allegedly demonstrated to an expert on the defense side that the Type-97 firearm can be readily and easily converted to fully automatic mode of operation in short time and with commonly available tools. As a result, Type-97 firearms were confiscated from the owners, and are no longer legal for civilian ownership in Canada (even for people with the so-called "12.2 fully automatic" firearm license).

On April 28, 2013, Emei's new T97NSR was classified as a "non-restricted" firearm by the RCMP with FRT Number 142760, and became legal for dealers to import for those with non-restricted possession and acquisition licenses. It is legal in Canada for hunting, varmint control, target practice and competitive shooting. It went into retail stores on September 17, 2013, and costs about $1,000 CAD. All QBZ95 and its variants (T97NSR, T97NSR-A) have been prohibited in Canada by name as of December 5, 2024.

==== NQZ03A ====
Export variant, chambered in 5.56 NATO.

==== NQZ03B ====
Shortened variant, chambered in 5.56 NATO.

==== Flat-top ====
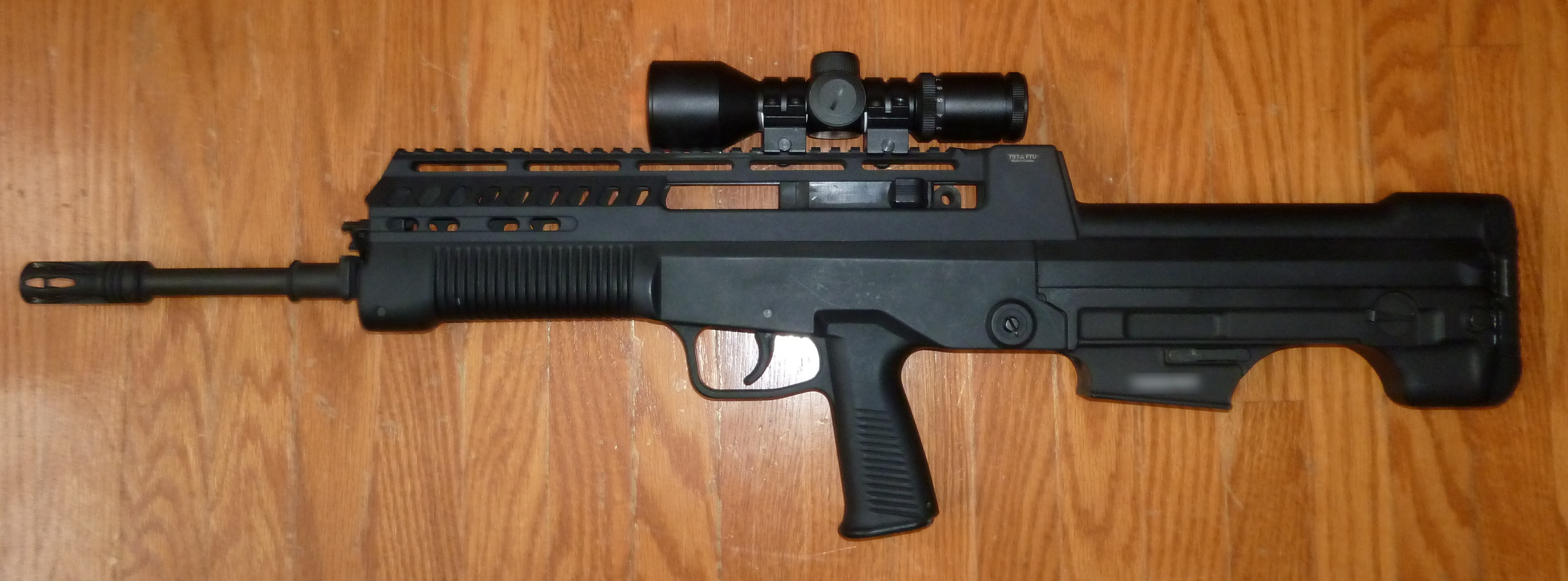
A T97NSR modified with a flat-top upper (FTU), made by T97.ca

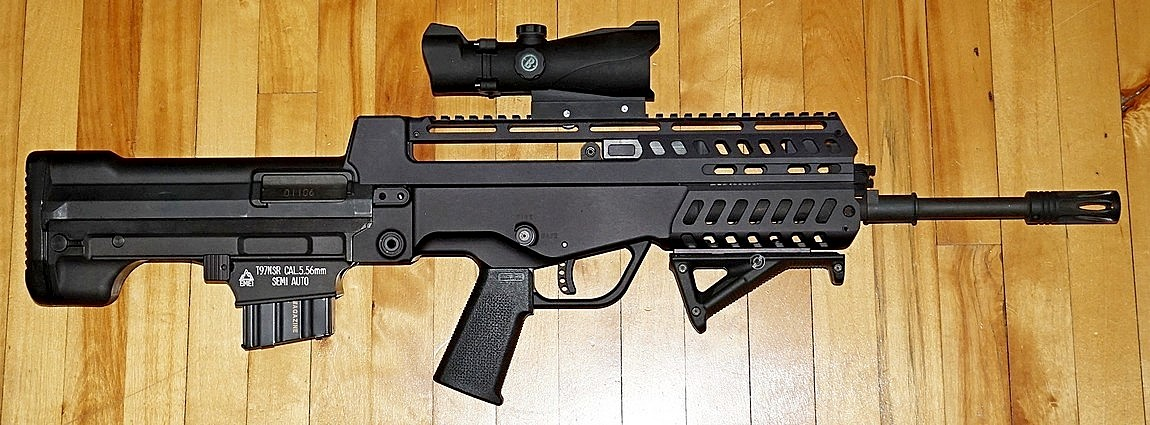
An EMEI T97NSR modified with a FTU and lower hand guard (LHG), made by T97.ca

Enhanced variants with a Picatinny rail replacing the top carrying handle (so called "flat-top") have been built in both Canada and China.

Two export variants, dubbed the "EM3516" and "T97NSR-A", have been unveiled.

==== K12 PUMA ====
12-gauge shotgun with a similar mechanism of action and outer resemblance, features a gas switch for heavy and light loads.

=== Foreign variants ===
==== Sudan ====
Sudanese QBZ-97 variant with UBGL. Appears to be made at the Military Industry Corporation from components shipped from China. Selected for Sudanese "Kombo" Future Soldier System.

== Users ==
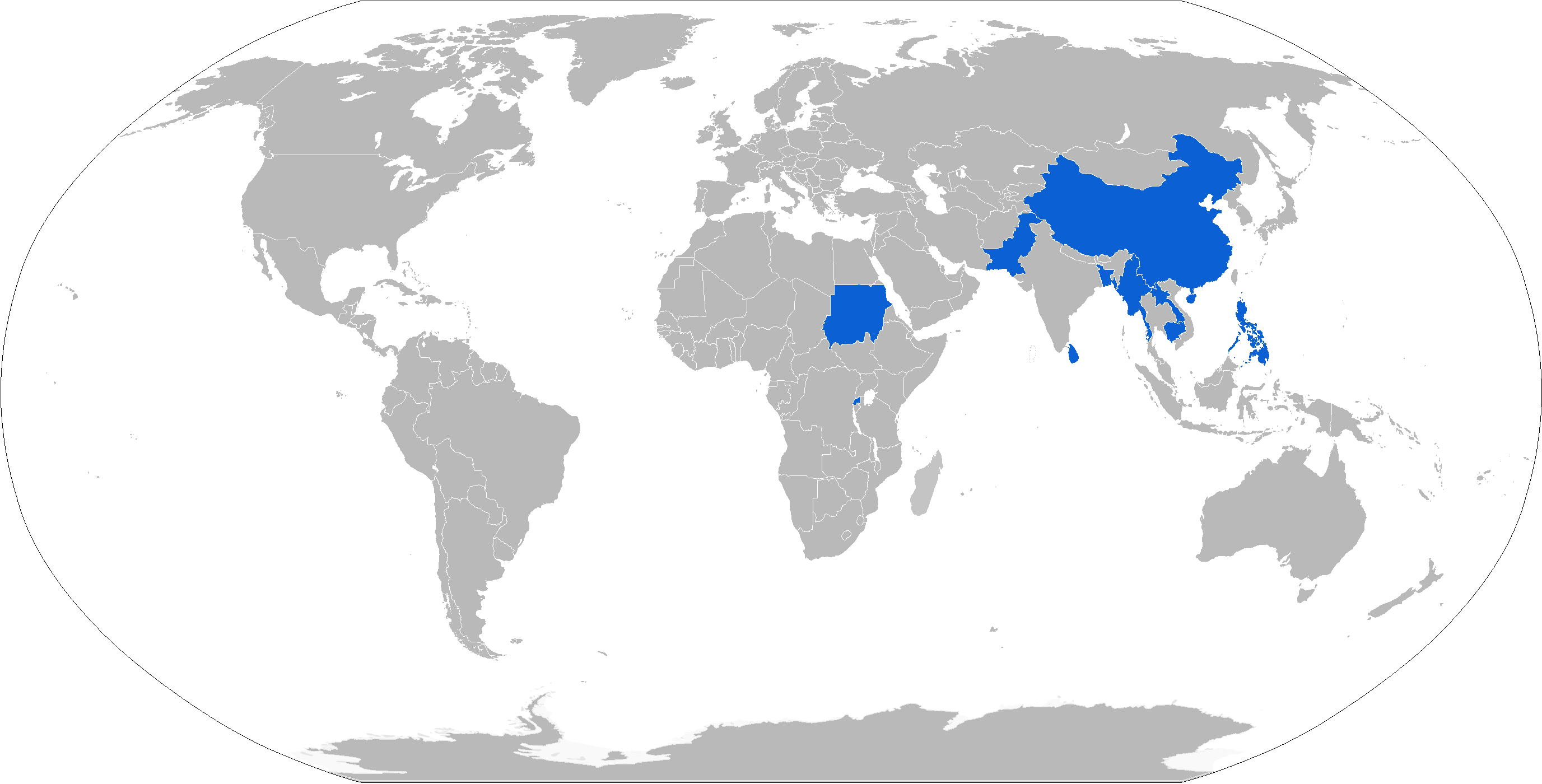
Current users of QBZ-95/97

- Cambodia: 911 Para-Commando Special Forces and Bodyguard Unit
- China:
  - People's Liberation Army - Phasing out
    - People's Liberation Army Ground Force
    - People's Liberation Army Navy
      - People's Liberation Army Navy Marine Corps
      - People's Liberation Army Navy Coastal Defense Force
    - People's Liberation Army Air Force Airborne Corps
    - People's Liberation Army Rocket Force
  - People's Armed Police
    - Chinese Coast Guard
  - Nanjing Municipal Public Security Bureau
  - Shenzhen Municipal Public Security Bureau
  - Tianjin Municipal Public Security Bureau SWAT: QBZ-95-1 variant
  - Hebei Prison Administrative Bureau
  - Guangdong Prison Administrative Bureau - Used by prison SWAT
  - National Immigration Administration - Used by police tactical units
- Laos
- Myanmar: QBZ-97s exported to Myanmar
- Pakistan
- Philippines: QBZ-97 variant used by Philippine National Police.
- Rwanda
- Sri Lanka - Used by special forces
- Solomon Islands: Supposed QBZ-95 replicas being used by Royal Solomon Islands Police Force for training.
- Venezuela: QBZ-97A used by the 99 Special Forces Brigade, 8th Generalissimo Francisco de Miranda Marine Special Operations (Commando) Brigade and the CEOFANB Counter-Terrorist Task Force.

=== Non-state actors ===
- Liberation Tigers of Tamil Eelam: Equipped with the QBZ-97.
- Wa State: Adopting the QBZ-97 to replace UWSA-made Type 81s.

== Bibliography ==
- Jenzen-Jones, N.R. (January 2017). "1896 to the Present". Global Development and Production of Self-loading Service Rifles: 1896 to the Present (PDF). Working Paper 25. Small Arms Survey. ISBN 978-2-940548-34-7. JSTOR resrep10728. Archived from the original (PDF) on June 29, 2017.
