= Gazi Md. Mozammel Haque =

Gazi Md. Mozammel Haque is an Additional Director General of Bangladesh Police. He is the director of Anondo Police Housing Society which owns land worth 66.5 billion Bangladesh taka. He is the Joint Secretary of Bangladesh Kabaddi Federation.

== Early life ==
Haque's father, Safar Ali Master, was the chairman of Barakanda Union in Araihazar Upazila of Narayanganj District.

== Career ==
Haque joined the police cadre of Bangladesh Civil Service in 1997.

In June 2008, Haque was transferred from the Additional Superintendent of police of the Criminal Investigation Department to the Assistant Inspector General of police headquarters.

Assistant Inspector General of police Haque, represented Anondo Police Housing Society in a meeting between real estate developers and Rajdhani Unnayan Kartripakkha over the Detailed Area Plan where he stated that Dhaka did not need wetlands in November 2017. He was promoted from Assistant Inspector General of Police to Additional Deputy Inspector General and stationed at Bangladesh Police headquarters.

In July 2018, members of the Bangladesh Police, led by Haque, detained Zaher Ali and his son and tortured them in detention. They were threatened with execution and forced to sign over his property in Rupganj Union and Demra to Anondo Police Housing Society. He also allegedly took three cars owned by them. The documents were taken by Haque, who is also a director of the society. On 14 March 2019, Zaher's daughter-in-law filled a case in Dhaka court against Additional Deputy Inspector General of Police Gazi Mozammel Haque, his wife, Detective Branch Inspector Dipok Kumar Das, Rupganj Police Station O.C. Moniruzzaman Monir, officials of the land office, Bangladesh Police, and United Commercial Bank. Asaduzzaman Khan Kamal, Minister of Home Affairs, stated that actions will be taken against Haque if evidence of land grabbing is found against him.

Haque wrote a book about Sheikh Mujibur Rahman from 1972 to 1975 titled Apritim Banglabandhu or Great Bangabandhu. He owns nine businesses including Breeze Pharmaceuticals Limited.

After the resignation of Prime Minister Sheikh Hasina, the Kaler Kantho reported that Haque and his wife owned property worth billions of taka. His wife owns Anondo Properties Limited, which owns the land at the housing society. He owns Meghna Resort and Fish Farm on the banks of Meghna River. In February 2025, Justice Md Zakir Hossain Galib of the Metropolitan Sessions Judge Court ordered a freezing of Haque's bank accounts.

== Personal life ==
Haque is married to Farzana Mozammel.
