= 35 mm grenade =

Type of Chinese grenade launcher ammunition

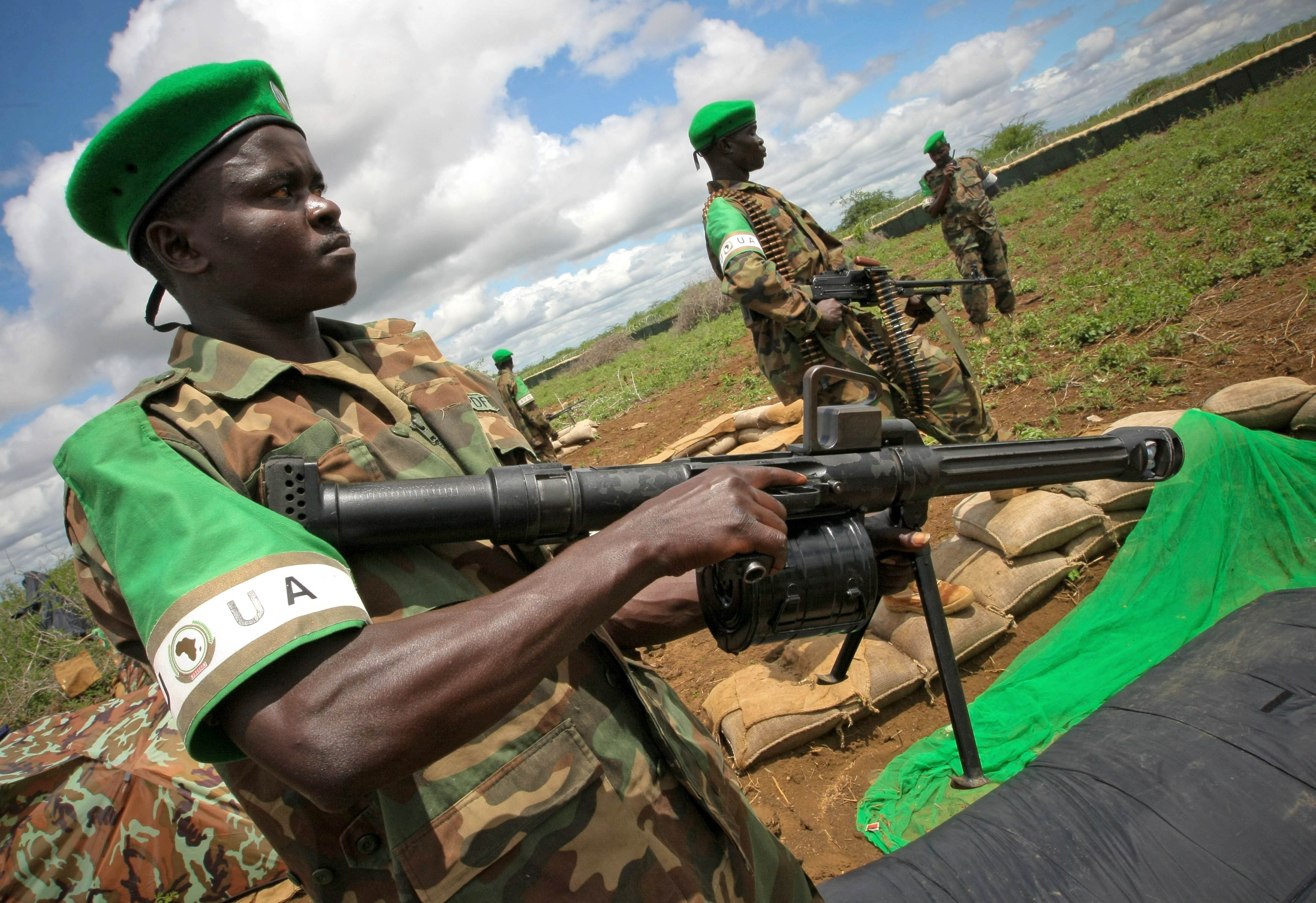
A QLZ-87 AGS fitted with 35×32 mm high-velocity grenades

The 35 mm grenade is a type of grenade launcher ammunition of Chinese origin. The type consists of many high-velocity and low-velocity grenades with a caliber of 35 mm (1.38 in).

== History ==
35 mm grenades are proprietary designs originating from China. In the 1980s, China began to experiment with different types of grenade launchers. Chinese designers felt Soviet 30 mm grenades had inadequate firepower, while NATO 40 mm grenades lacked portability, resulting in the adoption of 35 mm grenades for their grenade launchers, such as the QLZ-87 and QLZ-04.

== Grenade types ==
=== 35 mm high velocity ===
==== 35×32 mm Type 87 ====
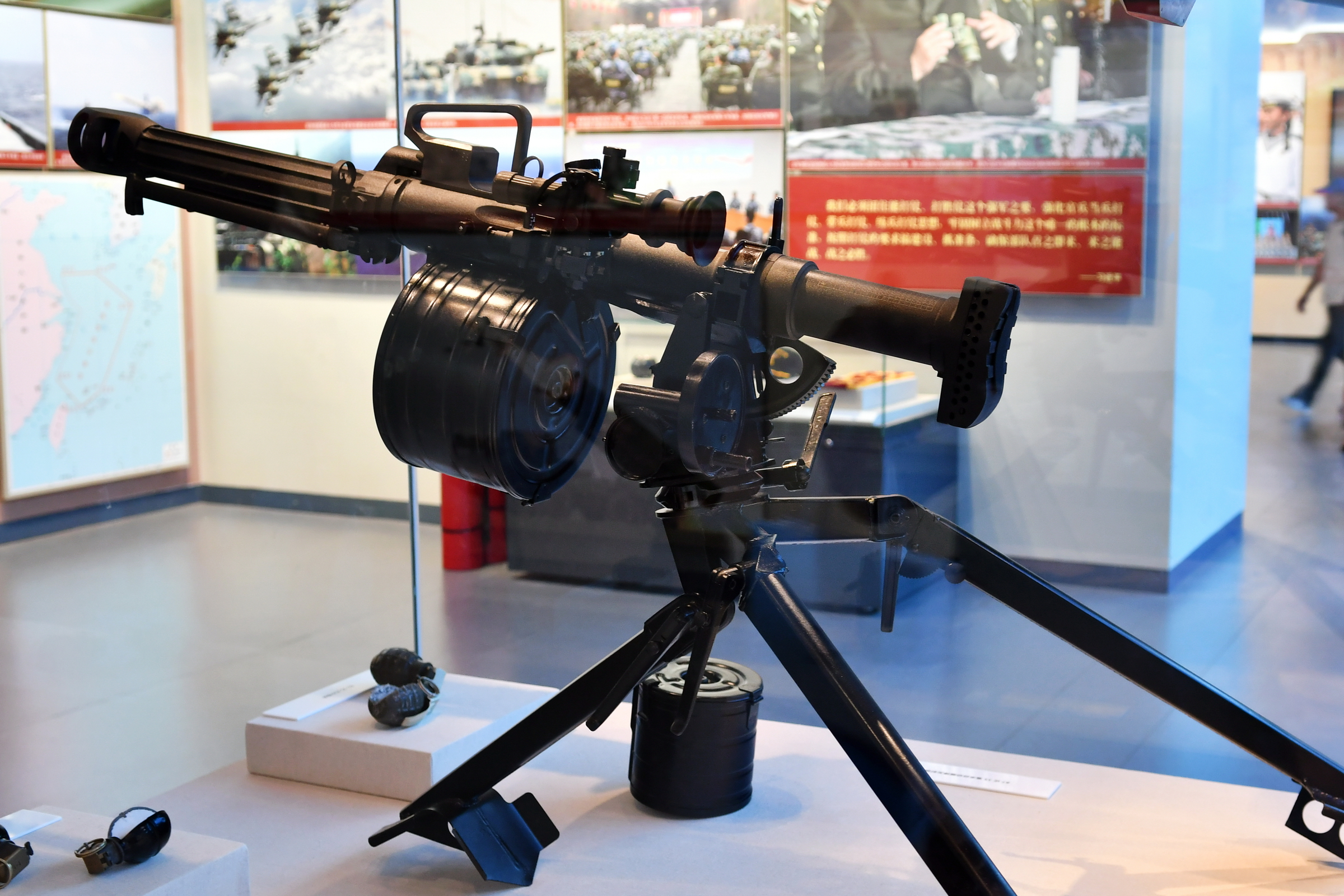
A Type 87 grenade launcher in the Military Museum of the Chinese People's Revolution

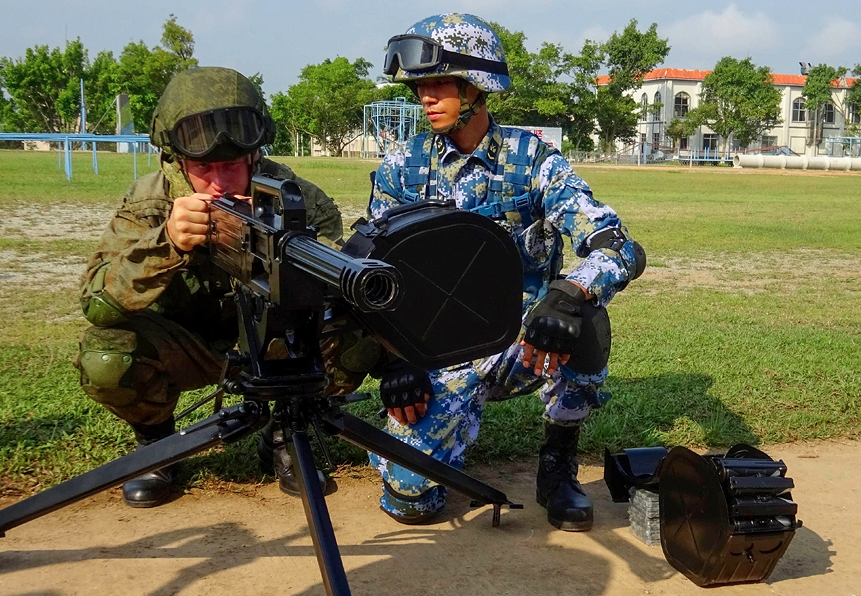
A QLZ-04 with 30-round 35×32 mm ammo container

The 35 mm Type 87 is a series of high velocity grenades designed for Type 87 grenade launchers and other automatic grenade launchers. The grenades are stabilized with spin rifling. The Type 87 has a typical grenade design with the propellant stored in the base, the warhead in the middle and the fuse in the nose section. The grenade is semi-rimmed with a relatively short case.

The shells are stored in an ammo box or attached to a belt. In additional to the Type 87, the ammo can also be used by the Type 04 automatic grenade launcher. The QLB-06, also known as the QLZ-87B, is an improved version of the Type 87 grenade launcher and shares its ammunition.

Various warhead types are available for 35×32mmSR Type 87s:

- DFS-87 (Chinese: DFS-87杀伤弹): Anti-personnel fragmentation grenade (HE-frag)
- DFJ-87 (Chinese: DFJ-87破甲杀伤弹): Dual purpose, armor-piercing grenade (HEDP)
- DFR-87 (Chinese: DFR-87燃烧弹): Incendiary grenade
- DFN-87 (Chinese: DFN-87杀伤燃烧弹): Anti-personnel fragmentation incendiary grenade
- DFD-87 (Chinese: DFD-87烟雾弹): Smoke/marker grenade, with colored smoke

Type 87 cartridge specification:

- Weight: 217–250 g (7.7–8.8 oz) (HE-frag and HEDP)
- Muzzle velocity: 190 m/s (620 ft/s) (HE-frag and HEDP)
- Maximum range: 1,750 m (5,740 ft) (HE-frag and HEDP)
- Blast radius: 11 m (36 ft) (HE-?)
- Penetration: 80 mm (3.1 in) of RHA (HEDP)

==== 35×32 mm Type 11 ====
The QLU-11 utilizes a new version of the 35×32mmSR (through old types are compatible). New ammunition is specifically designed for long range accuracy. Type 11 long range cartridges are derived from the DFJ-87 HEDP grenades, but the weights are reduced from 217 to 200 g (7.7 to 7.1 oz) due to lighter casings. Propellant takes a larger percentage of the cartridge space, thus improving the velocity from 195 to 320 m/s (640 to 1,050 ft/s). This modification greatly increases the recoil, which QLU-11 features advanced primer ignition (API) blowback to mitigate.

=== 35 mm low velocity ===
==== 35×115 mm Type 91 ====
The 35×115 mm Type 91 grenades are a series of low velocity grenades designed for the Type 91 grenade launcher, which comes with shoulder-launched, rifle-attached, and vehicle-mounted variants. The cartridge has a conventional design for breech loading similar to NATO 40 mm low velocity grenades.

Various warhead types are available for 35×115 mm Type 91, including:

- DFB-91 (Chinese: DFB-91震爆弹): Stun grenade
- DFT-91 (Chinese: DFT-91痛球弹): Sting grenade
- DFR-91 (Chinese: DFR-91染色弹): Paintball grenade
- DFC-91 (Chinese: DFC-91催泪弹): Tear gas
- DFG-91 (Chinese: DFG-91闪光弹): Flashbang

==== 35 mmCL Type 10 ====
Type 10 is a series of low-velocity grenades designed for the QLG-10 and QLG-10A rifle-attached grenade launchers. Standard Type 10 projectiles are caseless, and weigh 169 g (6.0 oz) with muzzle velocities of 78 m/s (260 ft/s). Type 10 grenades utilize high-low cartridges designed for low recoil operation with extended range. The grenade has an effective range of 400 m (1,300 ft).

Various warhead types are available for the 35 mmCL Type 10, including:

- DFS-10 (Chinese: DFS-10碰炸杀伤榴弹): High-explosive fragmentation grenade (HE-frag). Effective against infantry personal inside 400 m (1,300 ft) range.
- DFS-10A (Chinese: DFS-10A跳炸杀伤榴弹): Bouncing air-burst fragmentation grenade (HE) with 400 m (1,300 ft) range. Equipped with pre-set airburst munition and jump-up detonation fuse, similar to the US M397A1 40 mm cartridge.
- DFJ-10 (Chinese: DFJ-10破甲杀伤榴弹): High-explosive dual purpose grenade (HEDP) that is effective against infantry personnel inside a 400 m (1,300 ft) range, as well as against light vehicles in a 100 m (330 ft) range
- DFX-10 (Chinese: DFX-10弹道指示榴弹): Trajectory marker grenade (T) with 400 m (1,300 ft) range, can be used for trajectory adjustment for other grenade types
- DFD-10 (Chinese: DFD-10烟雾弹): Smoke grenade with 400 m (1,300 ft) range, with colored smoke available

== See also ==
- List of equipment of the People's Liberation Army Ground Force
- United States 40 mm grenades
