= QLZ-04 =

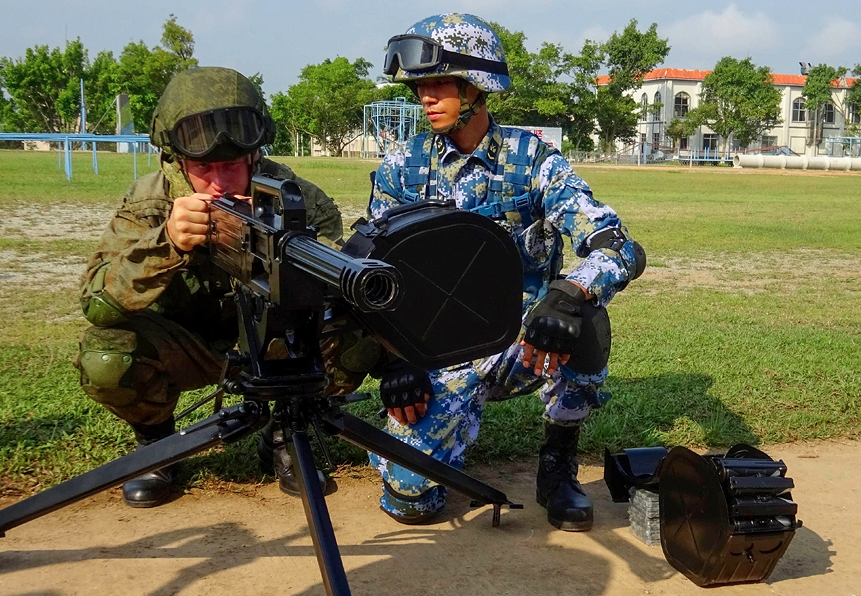
- A Russian soldier training to use the QLZ-04
- Type: Grenade launcher
- Place of origin: China

Service history
- In service: 2004–present
- Used by: China

Production history
- Designed: 1999–2004
- Manufacturer: Norinco
- Produced: 2004–present

Specifications
- Mass: 20 kg
- Length: 1,026 mm
- Barrel length: 380 mm
- Cartridge: HE-FRAG; HE-DP
- Action: Air-cooled, blowback, open bolt
- Rate of fire: 350–400 rounds per minute
- Effective firing range: 1,750 m
- Feed system: belt

The Type 04 automatic grenade launcher (military designation QLZ-04) is a Chinese 35x32SR mm belt-fed automatic grenade launcher, developed as an alternative to the older QLZ-87. It may be vehicle-mounted or crew-served.

== Variants ==
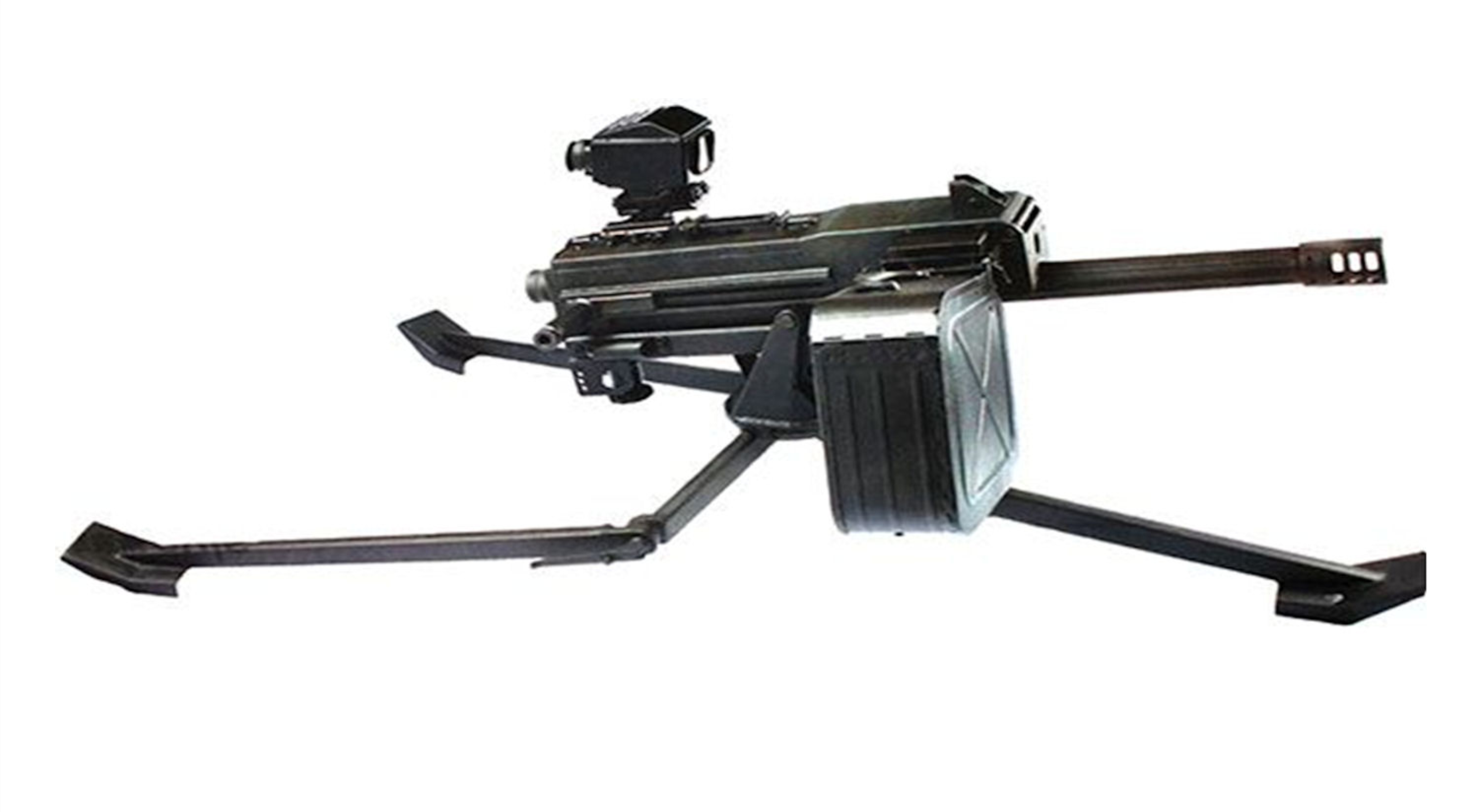
Export LG3 version

QLZ-04
Domestic version
LG3
Export version based on the QLZ-94, chambered in 40x53mm NATO grenade.

== See also ==
- QLZ-87 grenade launcher
- QTS-11
- Norinco LG5 / QLU-11
- Comparison of automatic grenade launchers

International:

- Mk 19 grenade launcher – (United States)
- Daewoo Precision Industries K4 – (South Korea)
- Howa Type 96 – (Japan)
- Mk 47 Striker – (United States)
- AGS-17 – (Soviet Union)
- AGS-30 – (Russia)
- AGS-40 – (Russia)
- Vektor Y3 AGL – (South Africa)
- SB LAG 40 – (Spain)
- HK GMG – (Germany)
- XM174 grenade launcher – (United States)
