= Type 91 grenade launcher =

Type 91 UBGL
- Type: Grenade launcher
- Place of origin: China

Service history
- Used by: China

Specifications
- Cartridge: 35mm Grenade
- Caliber: 35x115mm
- Action: Pump action
- Feed system: Single shot

The Type 91 Grenade Launcher is a Chinese grenade launcher used to launch 35mm non-lethal grenades. It may come in shoulder-launched, rifle-attached, and vehicle-mounted variants. The rifle mounted version has a similar loading mechanism to the American made M203.

== Design and development ==
The shoulder-fired launcher is a single-shot, manual-fed, and breech-loading weapon. It is lightweight, compact, breech-loading, and single-shot. It consists of a hand guard, sight, aluminum receiver assembly, barrel stop, and firing mechanism. The weapon could be used by any front-line assault troops in need of a long range explosive.

This weapon would be carried as a secondary weapon for a breacher, the member of a team who carries breach tool during an assault. The rifle-attached variant could be mounted on the underside of either a Type 56, Type 81, or QBZ-95.

== Grenade types ==
DFB-91
Stun grenade.
DFT-91
Sting grenade.
DFR-91
Paintball grenade.
DFC-91
Tear gas.
DFG-91
Flashbang.

== Variants ==
QLL-91
shoulder-fired variant
QLG-91
rifle-attached variant for Type 56 assault rifle.
QLG-91A
rifle-attached variant for Type 81 assault rifle.
QLG-91B
rifle-attached variant for QBZ-95

=== Vehicle-Mounted ===
This version of the Type 91 can be mounted on the WZ-551 internal security armored vehicle. It can fire in automatic and semi-automatic modes. The launcher is air-cooled, recoil operated, disintegrating metallic link-belt fed non lethal weapon.

== Users ==
- China: Used by the People's Liberation Army.
- South Sudan

== See also ==
- QLZ-87 grenade launcher
- QLG-10

International:

- M203
- M320
