= RGS-50M =

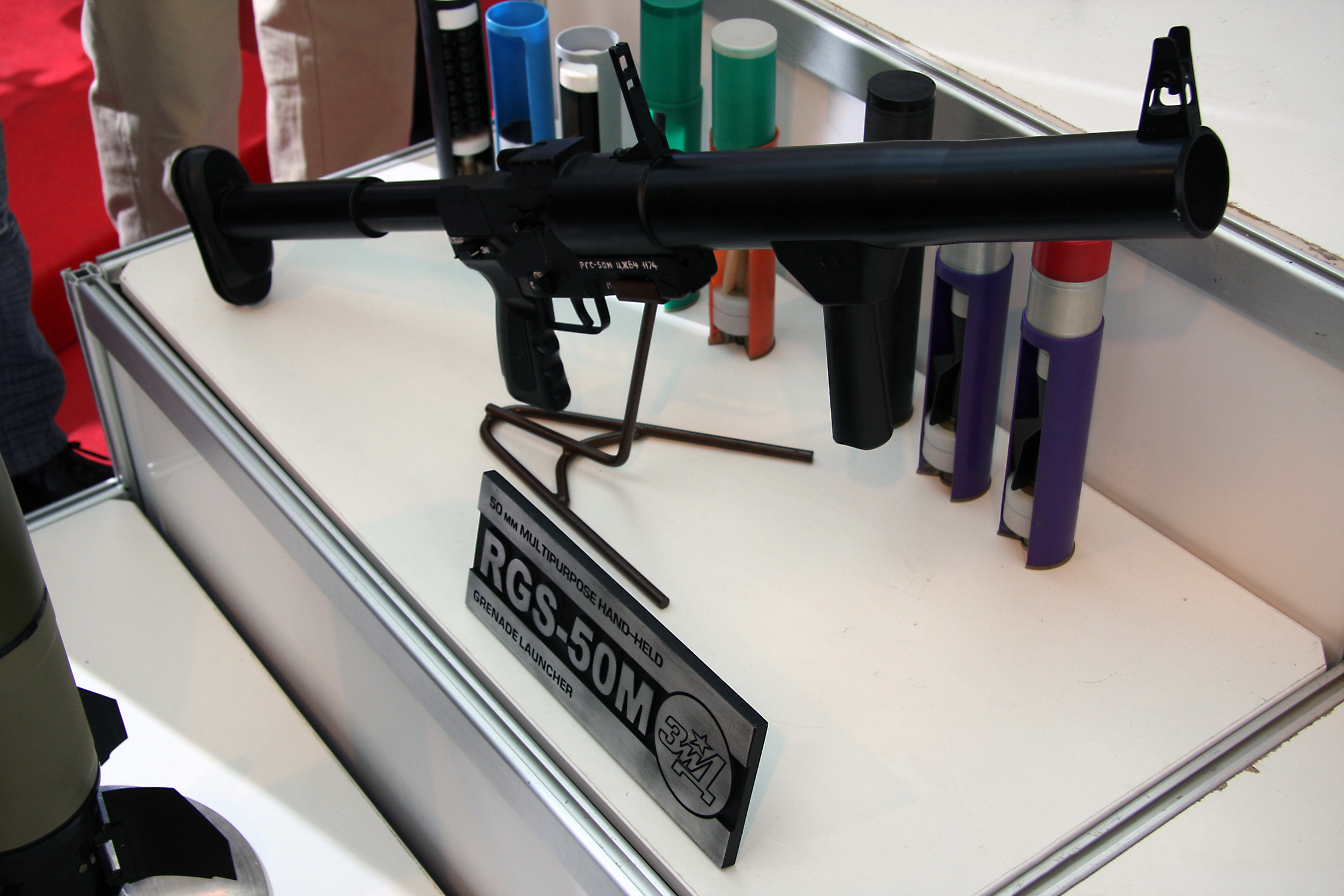
- A RGS-50M grenade launcher on display
- Type: Grenade launcher
- Place of origin: Russian Federation

Service history
- In service: late 1990s – present

Production history
- Manufacturer: Degtyaryov Plant

The RGS-50M is a smoothbore single-shot break-action Russian 50 mm (2.0 in) grenade launcher manufactured by Degtyarev Plant.

It is mainly intended for less than lethal (riot gun) and door breaching law enforcement roles, but it is also capable of firing lethal projectiles.

== Ammunition ==
Rubber baton, rubber buckshot, teargas grenade, FRAG grenade, Smoke grenade:

- GS-50 tear gas
- GSZ-50 flashbang
- EG-50 shock-effect rubber baton round
- EG-50M shock-effect rubber pellets buckshot
- GO-50 lethal fragmentation grenade
- GK-50 lethal shaped-charge grenade
- GV-50 door-buster
- GD-50 instantaneous smoke screen
- BK-50 glass-breaking
- GS-50M improved tear gas grenade
- GS-50PM training grenade

== History ==
The development of the RGS-50M started in the mid-1980s with the first few production models made in the late 1980s, back then known as the RGS-50. In the 1990s, the development of the RGS-50M started with a folding foregrip installed.

== Variants ==
- RGS-50 - Original version
- RGS-50M - Upgraded version with improved trigger, stock and recoil buffer

== Users ==
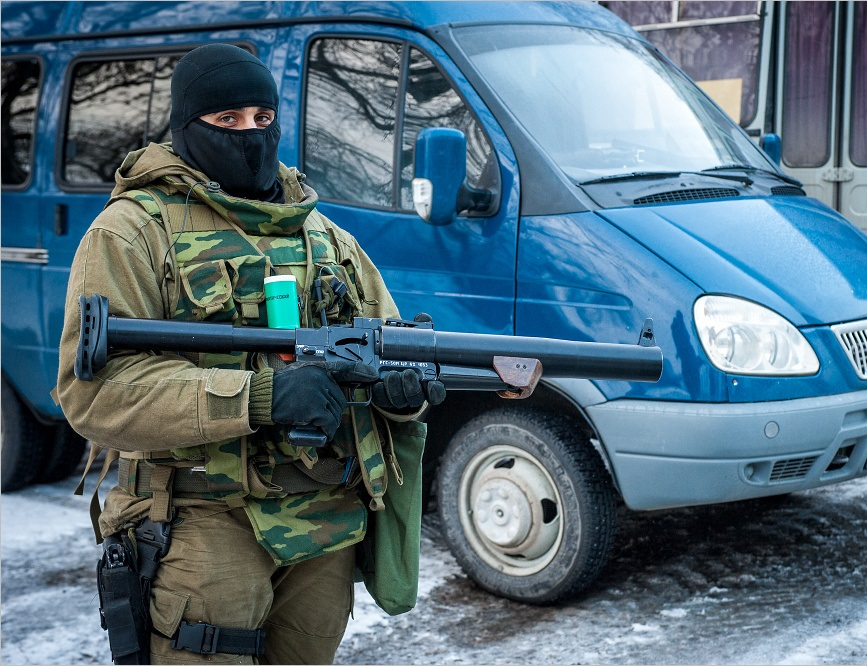
A soldier of the Russian National Guard with an RGS-50M hand grenade launcher

=== Current ===
- Russian Federation: Known to be ordered in 2014 for Ministry of Interior.

=== Former ===
- Soviet Union: RGS-50s bought by the KGB.

== See also ==
- GM-94 – (Russia)
- AGS-40 Balkan – (Russia)
- RGM-40 Kastet – (Russia)
- RGSh-30 – (Ukraine)
- DP-64 – (Soviet Union)
- DP-65 – (Russia)
- MRG-1 – (Soviet Union)
- M79 grenade launcher – (United States)
- M203 – (United States)
