= RGSh-30 =

- Type: Grenade launcher
- Place of origin: Ukraine

Production history
- Designer: Precision Systems
- Manufacturer: Precision Systems

Specifications
- Cartridge: 30mm

Ukrainian company Precision Systems developed a miniaturized handheld version of AGS-17 called RGSh-30 "in order to create a grenade launcher that could respond to the needs of Ukrainian units and special forces operating in the Donbas" that can be carried like an assault rifle. RGSh-30 is designed to disable armored vehicles. RGSh-30 uses magazines with five 30mm VOG-17 grenades.

Precision Systems plans to develop versions using 20mm, 25mm, and 40mm grenades.

== See also ==
- Neopup PAW-20 – (South Africa)
- RGS-50M – (Russia, Soviet Union)
- AGS-40 Balkan – (Russia)
- RGM-40 Kastet – (Russia)
- GM-94 – (Russia)
- DP-64 – (Soviet Union)
- MRG-1 – (Soviet Union)
- Fort-600 – (Ukraine)
