= RGM-40 Kastet =

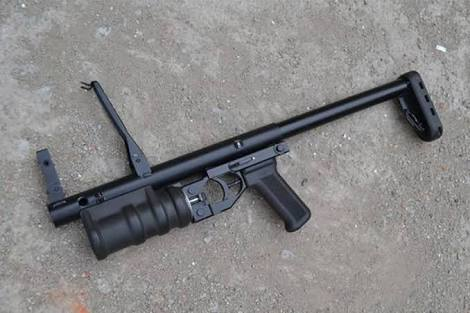
- Type: Grenade launcher
- Place of origin: Russia

Service history
- In service: 1997–present
- Used by: Russian Interior Ministry

Production history
- Designer: V.N. Teles
- Designed: 1997

Specifications
- Mass: 2.5 kg
- Length: 615 mm (24.2 in) stock extended 368 mm (14.5 in) stock retracted
- Barrel length: 129 millimetres (5.1 in)
- Cartridge: 40 mm caseless grenades: VOG-25, VOG-25P, GRD-40 and "Gvozd" (Nail)
- Caliber: 40mm Grenade
- Action: Muzzle loader
- Rate of fire: 5–6 rpm aimed shots 20 rpm area suppression
- Muzzle velocity: 76.5 m/s (251 ft/s)
- Effective firing range: 250 meters
- Feed system: Single shot
- Sights: Flip-up tangent sights

The RGM-40 Kastet (English: Brass knuckles) grenade launcher is a stand-alone version of the Russian GP-30 grenade launcher with a telescoping stock, AK-type pistol-grip and flip-up tangent sights. It is a single-shot muzzle loaded weapon with a self-cocking trigger mechanism and offers a high degree of commonality with the GP-30. It was designed primarily for police use and can use a wide range non-lethal ammunition (e.g., tear gas, stun grenades, etc.). It can also use standard 40mm VOG-25 and VOG-25P fragmentation grenades.

== Users ==
- Russia: Russian Interior Ministry

== See also ==
- RGS-50M – (Russia, Soviet Union): 50mm grenade launcher
- GM-94 – (Russia)
- RGSh-30 – (Ukraine)
- DP-64 – (Soviet Union)
- BS-1 Tishina – (Soviet Union)
- RG-6 grenade launcher – (Russia, Soviet Union)
- M79 Grenade Launcher – (United States)
- China Lake Grenade Launcher – (United States)
- HK 69 Grenade Launcher – (West Germany, Germany)
- HK M320 – (Germany)
- EAGLE grenade launcher – (Canada)
- B&T GL-06 Grenade Launcher – (Switzerland)
- Pallad grenade launcher – (Poland)
- Fort-600 Grenade Launcher – (Ukraine)
