= Grachonok-class patrol boat =

Russian naval ship class

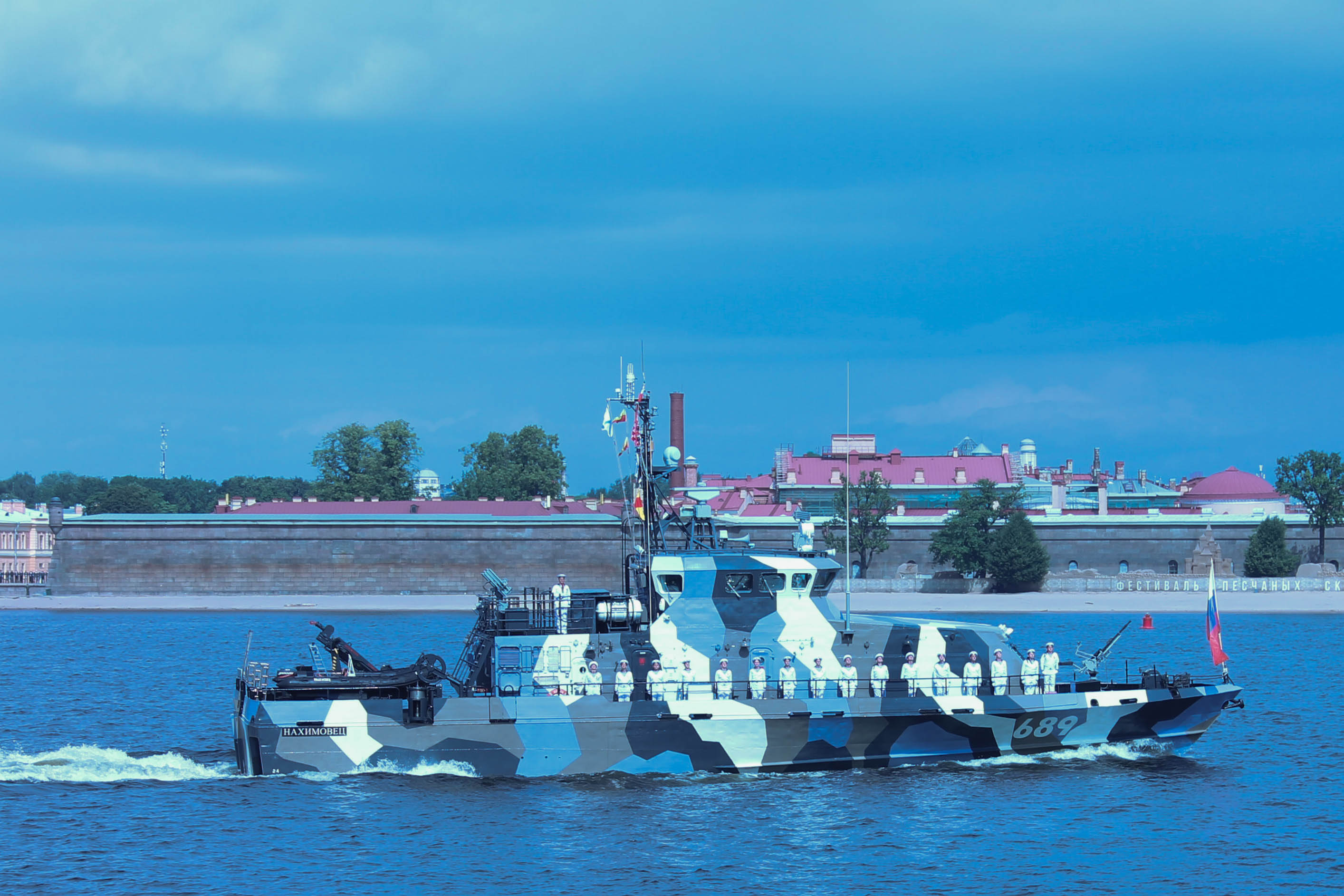
- The Russian Navy Grachonok-class anti-saboteur boat P-104 Nakhimovets during the Navy Day celebrations at Saint Petersburg in 2019

Class overview
- Name: Grachonok class
- Builders: Zelenodolsk Shipyard; Vostochnaya Verf; Vympel Shipyard
- Operators: Russian Navy; Russian National Guard
- Built: 2008–present
- In commission: 2009–present
- Building: 2 (as of 2025)
- Completed: 28
- Active: 27?
- Lost: 1?

General characteristics
- Type: Anti-saboteur boat
- Displacement: 138 tonnes (136 long tons; 152 short tons)
- Length: 31.04 m (101 ft 10 in)
- Beam: 7.4 m (24 ft 3 in)
- Draft: 1.85 m (6 ft 1 in)
- Propulsion: 2 × MTU or MWM-Deutz TBD620V12, Wärtsilä (other European or local Zvezda ZE, Kolomna) diesel engines
- Speed: 23 knots (43 km/h; 26 mph)
- Endurance: 5 days
- Complement: 8 crew
- Sensors & processing systems: 1 × MR-231 Pal navigational radar; 1 × Kalmar sonar; 1 × MG-757 Anapa-M anti-saboteur towed sonar
- Electronic warfare & decoys: 1 × MTK-201M3 electronic-optical television system
- Armament: 1 × 14.5 mm MTPU machine gun; 1 × DP-64 anti-sabotage grenade launcher; 1 × DP-65 remotely-controlled rocket grenade launcher system; 1 × Igla MANPADS (4 missiles)

The Grachonok class, Russian designation Project 21980 Grachonok, is a class of anti-saboteur and large guard boats being built for the Russian Navy. The class is designed to combat sabotage and terrorist forces and means in the waters off bases and near the approaches to them, as well as to assist the FSB Border Service of Russia in solving the problems of preservation and protection of the state border of Russia. Twenty-eight boats were built since 2008.

== History ==
In October 2017, four additional ships were ordered by the National Guard of Russia. These ships are intended for protection of the Crimean Bridge.

More boats were ordered for the Russian Navy in August 2024.

Around 18 April 2026, Alpha Group (Ukraine) launched multiple drones and likely damaged one Grachonok-class patrol boat in Occupied Crimea, marking one of several losses of the Black Sea Fleet during the Russo-Ukrainian war.

== Ships ==
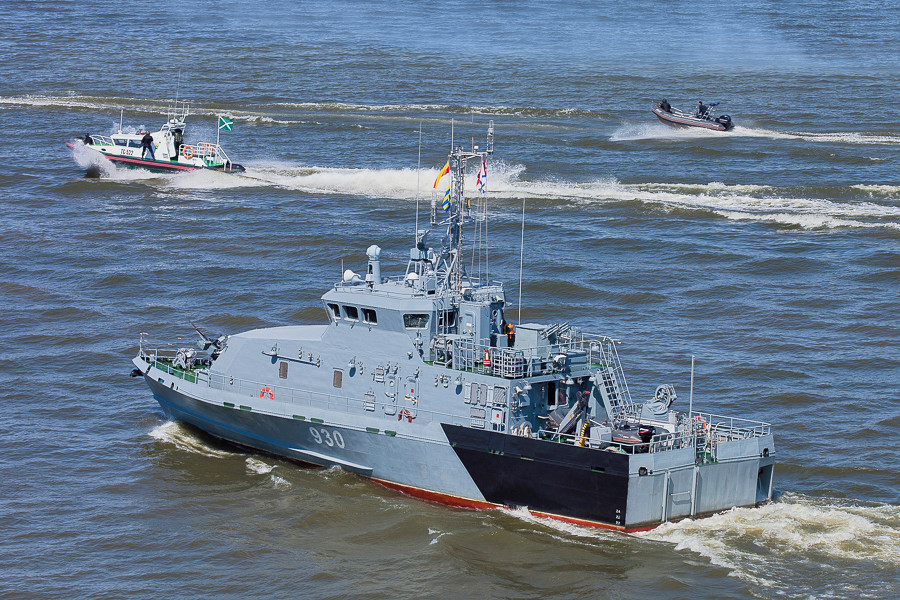
The Russian Navy Grachonok-class anti-saboteur boat P-351 (P-351 Yunarmeets Kaspiya since 2016) during the Navy Day celebrations at Astrakhan in 2015

Name	Hull No.	Builders	Laid down	Launched	Commissioned	Fleet	Status
Russian Navy
P-104 Nakhimovets	889 (2009), 689 (2016)	Zelenodolsk Shipyard	8 February 2008	25 April 2009	23 November 2009	Baltic Fleet	Active
P-191 Kadet	840	Zelenodolsk Shipyard	7 May 2010	July 2011	October 2011	Black Sea Fleet	Reported in the Mediterranean at the start of the Russo-Ukraine War; may have been abandoned at Tartus naval base in Syria in late 2024/early 2025 or possibly reactivated at that same location as of June 2026
P-349 Suvorovets	841	Zelenodolsk Shipyard	6 May 2011	16 June 2012	14 November 2012	Black Sea Fleet	Reported damaged in drone attack in August 2023; status unknown
P-350 Kursant Kirovets	842	Zelenodolsk Shipyard	5 May 2012	April 2013	22 August 2013	Black Sea Fleet	Active
P-377	996	Vostochnaya Verf, Vladivostok	15 March 2012	24 June 2013	26 September 2013	Pacific Fleet	Active
P-351 Yunarmeets Kaspiya	930 (2013), 600 (2016)	Zelenodolsk Shipyard	27 July 2012	June 2013	15 October 2013	Caspian Flotilla	Active
P-420 Yunarmeets Primorya	997	Vostochnaya Verf, Vladivostok	August 2012	29 November 2013	24 February 2014	Pacific Fleet	Active
P-355 Yunarmeets Kryma	836	Zelenodolsk Shipyard	7 May 2013	30 May 2014	17 March 2015	Black Sea Fleet	Active
P-417 Yunarmeets Kamchatki	998	Vostochnaya Verf, Vladivostok	December 2012	4 July 2013	25 September 2014	Pacific Fleet	Active
P-424 Kinel	837	Zelenodolsk Shipyard	27 July 2013	2014	9 October 2014	Black Sea Fleet	Active
P-340 Yunarmeets Zapolyarya	669 (2016), 938 (2018)	Vympel Shipyard	March 2014	7 June 2016	19 November 2016	Northern Fleet	Active
P-421 Yunarmeets Belomorya	699 (2016), 939 (2018)	Vympel Shipyard	December 2014	22 July 2016	19 November 2016	Northern Fleet	Active
P-429 Sergey Preminin	936	Vympel Shipyard	15 September 2015	27 April 2017	27 August 2017	Northern Fleet	Active
P-433 Pavel Silaev	844	Zelenodolsk Shipyard	12 January 2015	2017	16 September 2017	Black Sea Fleet	Active
P-431 Yunarmeets Chukotki	994	Vostochnaya Verf, Vladivostok	2016	2017	14 October 2017	Pacific Fleet	Active
P-430 Valeriy Fedyanin	941	Vympel Shipyard	15 April 2016	22 June 2017	2 November 2017	Northern Fleet	Active
Yunarmeets Tatarstana	601	Zelenodolsk Shipyard	7 May 2015	15 June 2018	October 2018	Caspian Flotilla	Active
P-445	973	Vostochnaya Verf, Vladivostok	2017	12 October 2018	14 January 2019	Pacific Fleet	Active
P-449 Yunarmeets Dagestana	602	Zelenodolsk Shipyard	24 April 2019	2019	August 2019	Caspian Flotilla	Active
P-450 Yunarmeets Sakhalina	969	Vostochnaya Verf, Vladivostok		10 August 2020	28 May 2021	Pacific Fleet	Active
P-468	651	Zelenodolsk Shipyard	7 August 2020	23 July 2021	23 June 2022	Baltic Fleet	Active
P-471 Vladimir Nosov	652	Zelenodolsk Shipyard	7 August 2020	23 July 2021	23 June 2022	Baltic Fleet	Active
P-474	695	Zelenodolsk Shipyard	19 February 2021	10 June 2022	1 November 2022	Baltic Fleet	Active
P-475 Denis Vasilchenko (formerly Grachonok)		Vympel Shipyard	15 July 2021	7 June 2024	30 December 2024	Northern Fleet	Active
?		Zelenodolsk Shipyard	7 May 2025			?	Both reportedly under construction
?		Zelenodolsk Shipyard	7 May 2025			?	Both reportedly under construction
National Guard Forces Command
PDKA No. 478	478	Vympel Shipyard	15 May 2018	19 June 2019	November 2019	Black Sea	Active
PDKA No. 479	479	Vympel Shipyard		10 July 2019	2019	Black Sea	Active
PDKA No. 480	480	Vympel Shipyard		30 July 2019	2020	Black Sea	Active
PDKA No. 481	481	Vympel Shipyard		19 September 2019	November 2020	Black Sea	Active
