= Heckler & Koch HK69A1 =

HK69A1
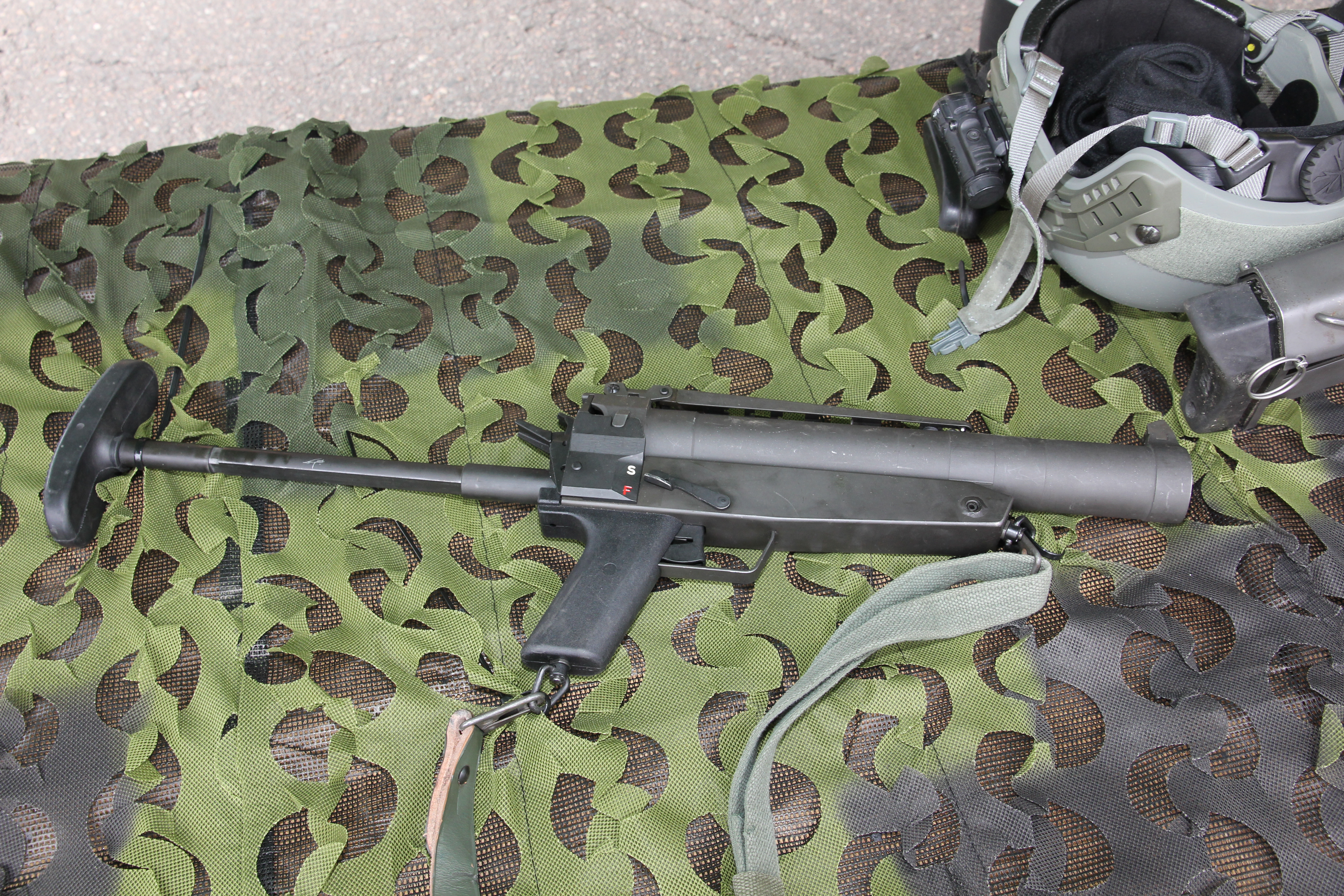
- The HK69A1 of the Finnish military, with stock extended
- Type: Grenade launcher
- Place of origin: West Germany

Service history
- Used by: See Users
- Wars: Turkish-Kurdish conflict Nicaraguan Revolution; Sri Lankan Civil War; United States invasion of Panama

Production history
- Designer: Heckler & Koch
- Designed: 1960s
- Manufacturer: Heckler & Koch
- Variants: MZP-1, HK79, HK79A1, GL-40/90

Specifications
- Mass: 2.60 kg (5.73 lb)
- Length: 683 mm (26.9 in) stock extended 463 mm (18.2 in) stock collapsed
- Barrel length: 356 mm (14.0 in)
- Width: 55 mm (2.2 in)
- Height: 205 mm (8.1 in)
- Cartridge: 40×46mm grenade
- Action: Break-action
- Muzzle velocity: 75 m/s (246 ft/s)
- Effective firing range: 50 to 350 m sight adjustments
- Feed system: Breech-loaded, single-shot
- Sights: Aperture flip short range sights (50 to 100 m), folding ladder sight graduated from 150 to 350 m

The HK69A1 is a 40 mm grenade launcher developed and produced by the German arms manufacturer Heckler & Koch (H&K). The weapon was designed to engage enemy troops and strongpoints out to a distance of 350 m; it can also be used to deploy smoke grenades and illumination flares.

== Development ==
The launcher's history dates back to the late 1960s, when development began of a weapon intended to be fitted (using a special mount) under the barrel of the 7.62×51mm NATO G3A3 rifle. In 1972 the prototype was unveiled of what would ultimately become the Granatpistole HK69. After being evaluated, the decision was made to develop an autonomous stand-alone version of the grenade launcher, which was created in 1979 and designated the HK69A1. In the 1980s the weapon was adopted into service with the German Army as the Granatpistole 40 mm (known also in the abbreviated form GraPi). It is also used by the special forces and security personnel of several other countries.

== Design details ==
The grenade launcher is a single-shot, shoulder-fired, breech-loaded weapon that fires a projectile using the High-Low System. The main component is the frame that contains and integrates all of the weapon's mechanisms and assemblies. The weapon features a rifled barrel, which is hinged at the front and tilted upward ("break action") for loading and removing spent shell casings. The barrel in the "combat ready" position locks into the frame with a rotary latch, mounted at the rear of the frame. The grenade launcher does not have an extractor; instead notches were cut into the base of the barrel that enable the operator to remove spent shell casings manually.

The HK69A1 has a single action firing mechanism with an exposed hammer that is cocked manually with the thumb after loading a round. A manual safety secures against accidental firing; the safety is ambidextrous and provides a lever on each side of the frame, above the trigger (the lever in the "S" position – indicates the weapon is safe; "F" – ready to fire).

The grenade launcher is aimed using iron sights that consist of a front post (adjustable for elevation) and a rear sight that has a flip-up dual aperture for short-range engagements (50 and 100 m settings) and a folding ladder-type leaf sight for long distance firing (has notched steps for 150, 200, 250 and 350 m), that is folded down and over the barrel when stowed. The weapon has a synthetic pistol grip, a lightweight telescopic metal stock with a rubber shoulder pad and sling swivels for use with a sling. The grenade launcher is typically carried in a thigh holster.

== Variants ==
The HK69A1 is also available in a 40 mm police variant, called the MZP 1 (short for Mehrzweckpistole 1 > "Multipurpose Pistol #1"). It is equipped only with a flip sight with 50, 100 and 150 m range adjustments; the leaf sight was removed. The MZP-1 weighs 2.52 kg (5.6 lb), the remaining parameters are identical to those of the HK69A1. It is used as a tear gas grenade launcher. Dual use as signal-/flare launcher is possible but no longer common (German police).

A version fitted with a 37mm barrel (rifled rather than the typical smoothbore used with 37mm munitions) was adopted by Britain as the L104A1. The bore was rifled to increase the accuracy of the L21A1 plastic baton round, thus reducing the likelihood of unintentionally hitting a vulnerable part of the body and causing a fatal injury.

Based on the HK69A1 is the HK79 underslung grenade launcher, designed to be mounted under the barrel of the G3 and G41 series of assault rifles (with the exception of the short, carbine versions). When attached, the HK79 does not affect the accuracy of the rifle, since the barrel is free to oscillate. Handling and operating functions of the rifle are not affected by the presence of the launcher. The weapon is used by the armed forces of Nicaragua, Norway and Panama. The HK79 is a single-fire, manually operated weapon, whose breech-loaded steel barrel is tilted downward for loading and unloading (compared to the HK69A1, which hinges upward). The barrel in the closed position is locked into battery with a rear-mounted latch. The weapon lacks an extractor; cuts made into the barrel's base assist the user in manually removing spent cartridges.

The HK79 is fitted with an internal, single-action firing mechanism that has a charging mechanism located at the rear of the frame (the mechanism is cocked manually after loading the weapon) and a trigger mechanism with a button-type trigger located on the left-hand side of the handguard. Safe operation is ensured by means of a cross-bolt manual safety catch (installed in the frame, forward of the cocking mechanism). The safety mechanism's "safe" and "ready" positions are marked with red and white rings respectively; the weapon can be loaded and cocked with the safety set at either position. A quadrant sight is provided for aiming, fitted to the right side of the grenade launcher, providing a rotating frame with a post and notch sight, graduated for distances from 50 to 350 m, every 50 m. The launcher weighs 1.5 kg (3.3 lb) unloaded; the muzzle velocity using standard ammunition is approx. 76 m/s (249.3 ft/s). The HK79A1 is a variant specially designed for installation on the HK33 assault rifle.

The DM101 A2 (IM) HE-Frag grenade statistics:

- Cartridge: 40 × 46 mm.
- Fuse(s): Point-detonating nose fuse, 4-second delay fuse, and 8-second self-destruct fuse.
- Weight (Projectile): 0.176 kg.
  - Filler: 0.03 kg of Hexal 70/30 explosive.
  - Payload: 700 2.25 mm steel balls impregnated in the shell casing.
- Weight (Shell): 0.232 kg.
- Area of Effect,
  - Lethal Fragmentation: 5 m.
  - Maximum Fragmentation: 12 m.

Both the HK69A1 and the HK79 use 40×46mm low-velocity grenade rounds. The Diehl BGT Defence DM101 A2 (IM) HE-Frag grenade is the Bundeswehr's standard-issue ammunition for use with the weapon. It was designed to contain most of its lethal fragmentation within a 5-meter area of effect, a measure meant to reduce "friendly fire" casualties during rapid assaults or close-in perimeter defense.

A development of the HK79A1 is the 40 mm underslung SA80 grenade launcher, adapted for use on the British 5.56×45mm NATO L85A1 assault rifle, where it is mounted by replacing the handguard in a similar manner to the early versions of the US-made M203. This was one of the early studies for an under-carried launcher to be mated to the SA80, and never acquired. The necessary step in equipping the SA80 rifles with an underslung grenade launcher was made only in the year 2003 with the adoption of the L17A1/A2 (a variant of the AG36 launcher).

The HK69A1 was manufactured under license in Italy by Luigi Franchi S.p.A. as the GL-40/90; it differs from the original German launcher as it features a modified sliding stock assembly and different grips and sights, all made of plastic. It is used by several Italian Law Enforcement agencies for riot control. No military use is made of this weapon in Italy as the Italian Military is equipped with other types of grenade launchers such as the Singaporean CIS 40 GL, again manufactured by Franchi under license, and the American M203 grenade launcher.

== Users ==
- Argentina: HK69 variant.
- Austria: MZP-1 variant is used by EKO Cobra.
- Denmark: HK69A1 is used by the Danish Police for launching tear gas grenades.
- Finland: HK69A1 used by the Finnish Defence Forces as the 40 KRPIST 2002 (Kranaattipistooli 2002).
- Germany: The German Armed Forces, particularly the German Army, use the HK69A1 as "Granatpistole 40 mm.
- Luxembourg: MZP-1 variant is used by the Unité Spéciale de la Police intervention unit of the Grand Ducal Police.
- Malaysia: Royal Malaysia Police
- Norway: HK79 variant.
- Panama
- Saudi Arabia: HK69 variant.
- Sri Lanka: HK69 variant.
- United Kingdom: HK69A1 37mm L104 riot grenade launcher is used by numerous police forces for less lethal Baton rounds.
  - Northern Ireland: Police Service of Northern Ireland (formerly Royal Ulster Constabulary) uses 37mm L104 riot grenade launcher variant with optical sight introduced in 1994 for baton rounds.

=== Former users ===
- Portugal: HK79 variant used by the Portuguese Army until 2019 when it was replaced by the FN40GL.
- Turkey: HK79 variant used by the Gendarmerie General Command until late 1990s and early 2000s when it was replaced by the T-40.

== See also ==
- B&T GL-06 grenade launcher
- EAGLE grenade launcher
- Fort-600 grenade launcher
- M203 grenade launcher
- M79 grenade launcher
- Milkor Stopper grenade launcher
- RGM-40 grenade launcher
