= EAGLE grenade launcher =

EAGLE
- Type: Grenade launcher
- Place of origin: Canada

Production history
- Manufacturer: Colt Canada

Specifications
- Mass: 2.14 kg (4.7 lb) Basic
- Length: 30.5 cm (12.0 in) Unit; 60.4 cm (23.8 in) extended 52.0 cm (20.5 in) retracted
- Barrel length: 21.9 cm (8.6 in) Standard; 25.4 cm (10.0 in) Extended
- Width: 7.4 cm (2.9 in)
- Height: 19.0 cm (7.5 in) with Buttstock; 16.9 cm (6.7 in)
- Cartridge: 40×46mm
- Caliber: 40 x 46mm Low Velocity
- Barrels: Single-barreled
- Action: Single shot with double action trigger
- Feed system: Single side feed
- Sights: Direct fire iron sights / Tilt-up ladder 100 - 400m

The EAGLE is a grenade launcher of Canadian origin. The weapon is chambered in the 40mm round and is a grenade launcher attachment. A MIL-STD rail is required for attachment. It can be used on the C7/M16, C8/M4 series rifles/carbines or as a stand-alone weapon. It is designed with ambidextrous operation in mind, allowing for the sight mount, sling attachment point, and side-opening feed to be switched to either the left or right side of the weapon.

== See also ==
- M203 grenade launcher – (United States)
- M79 grenade launcher – (United States)
- HK69 grenade launcher – (West Germany, Germany)
- B&T GL-06 Grenade Launcher – (Switzerland)
- Fort-600 grenade launcher – (Ukraine)
- RGM-40 grenade launcher – (Russia)
