= Mangust-class patrol boat =

Russian Coast Guard Vessel

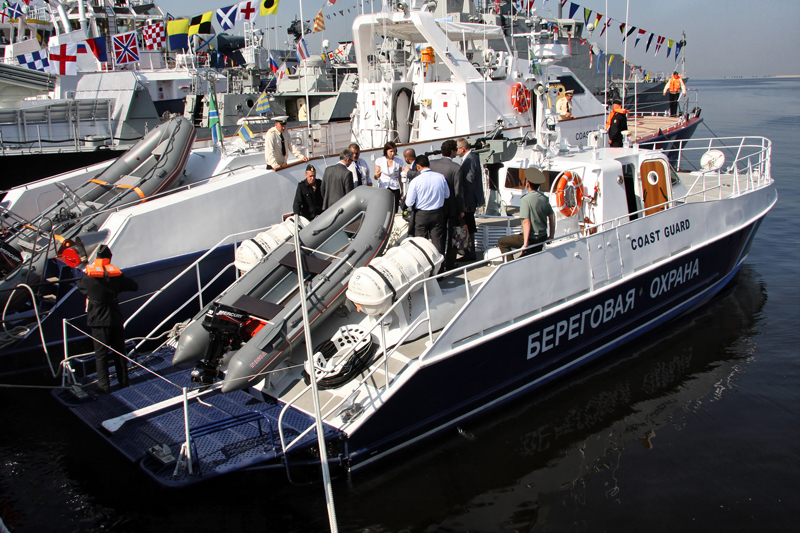
- A Mangust-class patrol boat (nearest) beside a Sobol-class patrol boat

Class overview
- Name: Mangust class
- Builders: Vympel Shipyard
- Operators: Russian Coast Guard
- In commission: 2001
- Completed: 62
- Active: 61?

General characteristics
- Type: Fast patrol craft
- Displacement: 27.2 t (26.8 long tons; 30.0 short tons)
- Length: 19.45 m (63 ft 10 in)
- Beam: 4.4 m (14 ft 5 in)
- Draft: 0.89 m (2 ft 11 in)
- Installed power: 2 × M470M Zvezda ZE or MTU 10V 2000 M93 or M470MK Zvezda; 1 x diesel generator
- Speed: Max: 50 knots (93 km/h; 58 mph)
- Range: 410 nmi (760 km; 470 mi)
- Endurance: 2 days
- Complement: 6
- Sensors & processing systems: Integrated navigation system; Navigation radar; Communication systems
- Armament: 1 × 12.7 mm Uprava-Kord machine gun; 2 × Igla surface-to-air missile systems; 2 × 30 mm grenade launchers; 1 × DP-64 hand anti-diver grenade launcher; Small arms

The Mangust-class patrol boat, Russian designation Project 12150, is a Russian Coast Guard vessel. The patrol craft is designed to operate in coastal areas, ports, and other littoral areas, to perform missions such as protection of territorial maritime borders, law enforcement, other defense missions, search and rescue, protection of fisheries, and enforcing rules of navigation.

== Design ==
The craft has a modern design with various comforts for the crew such as low noise levels, air conditioning and well designed layout for better working and living conditions for the crew. They are armed with a variety of weapons to engage surface, air, and underwater threats. They are also equipped with a small boat for missions such as boarding operations.

== Operators ==
=== As of 2022 ===
- Baltic Fleet: 12 boats in operation
- Black Sea Fleet: 29 boats in operation
- Pacific Fleet: 9 boats in operation
- Caspian Flotilla: 11 boats in operation
- Amur: 1 vessel

In May 2024, Ukraine used MAGURA V5 sea drones to attack a Russian patrol boat in Crimea. Footage was released appearing to show the drone detonating next to a small boat appearing to resemble a Mangust-class vessel.

=== Former ===
2 boats were transferred from the Black Sea Fleet to the Baltic Fleet in 2016. In 2019, one Mangust-class patrol boat, PSKA-600, was decommissioned and sold to a civilian buyer.

== See also ==
- List of ships of Russia by project number
