= GP-25 =

GP-25 grenade launcher
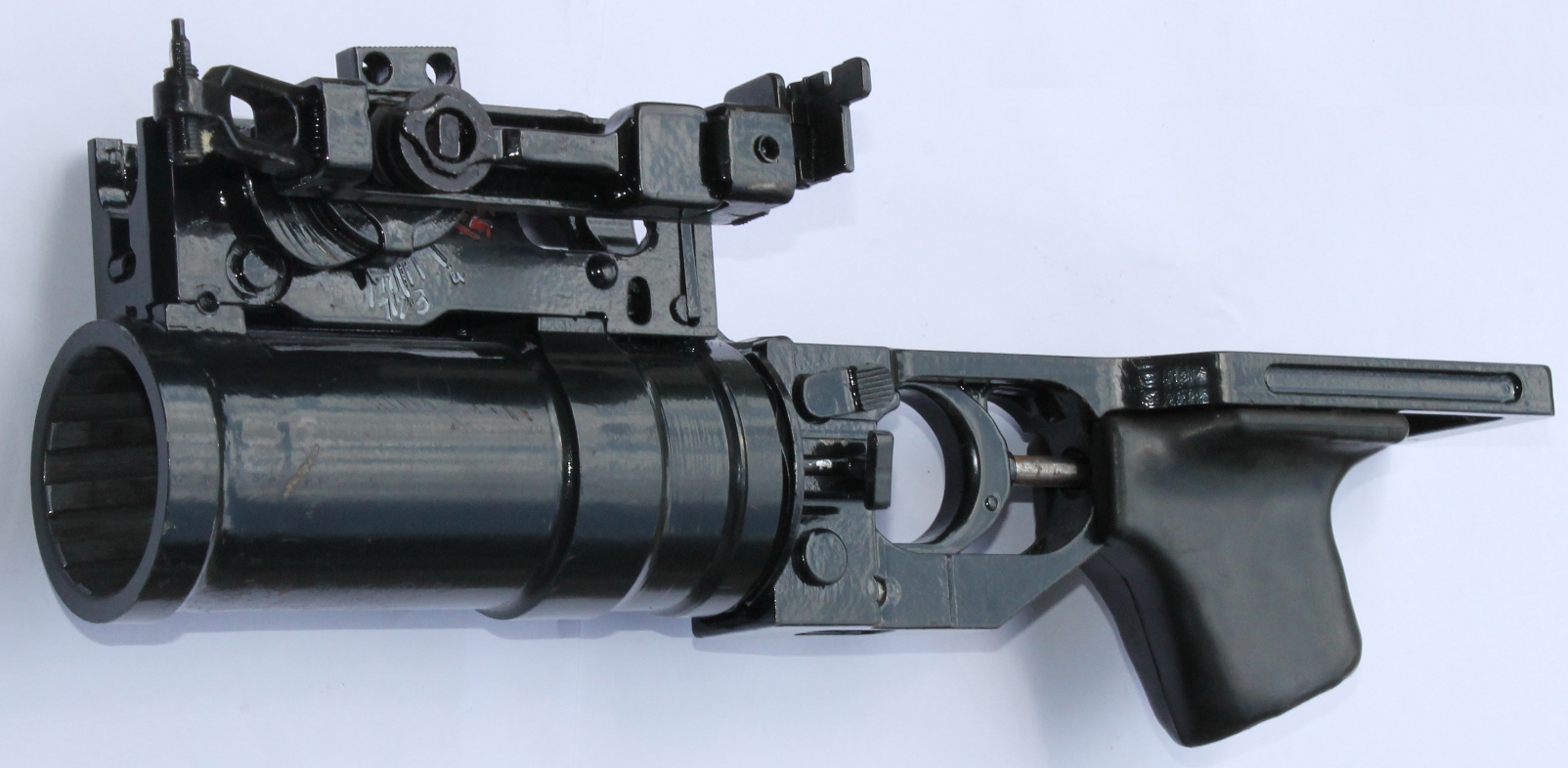
- Type: Grenade launcher
- Place of origin: Soviet Union

Service history
- In service: 1978–present
- Used by: See Users
- Wars: Afghan conflict; Soviet–Afghan War; War in Afghanistan; Transnistria war; First Chechen war; Second Chechen War; Russo-Georgian War; Syrian Civil War; Russo-Ukrainian War; War in Donbas; Russo-Ukrainian war; Yemeni Civil War; Saudi Arabian-led intervention in Yemen; Houthi–Saudi Arabian conflict

Production history
- Designer: TsKIB SOO
- Designed: 1966–1978
- Manufacturer: Kalashnikov Concern; STC Delta; Arsenal AD; Zastava Arms
- Produced: 1978–present
- Variants: GP-30, GP-30M, GP-34

Specifications
- Mass: 1.5 kg (3.31 lb) (GP-25); 1.3 kg (2.9 lb) (GP-30); 1.4 kg (3.1 lb) (GP-34)
- Length: 323 mm (12.7 in) (GP-25); 275 mm (10.8 in) (GP-30); 315 mm (12.4 in) (GP-34)
- Barrel length: 120 mm (4.7 in)
- Cartridge: 40 mm internal propellant caseless ammunition (CL)
- Caliber: 40 mm
- Action: Closed system, single-shot
- Rate of fire: 20 rounds/min area suppression 5–6 rounds/min aimed shots
- Muzzle velocity: 76.5 m/s (251 ft/s)
- Effective firing range: Sights adjustable 100 to 400 meters
- Feed system: Muzzleloader
- Sights: Notched quadrant sight

The GP-25 Kostyor ("Bonfire"), GP-30 Obuvka ("Shoe") and GP-34 are a family of Russian 40 mm under-barrel muzzleloaded grenade launchers for the AK family of assault rifles. The acronym GP stands for Granatomyot Podstvolnyj, "under-barrel grenade launcher" in Russian, and was adopted by Soviet forces in 1978.

== Development ==
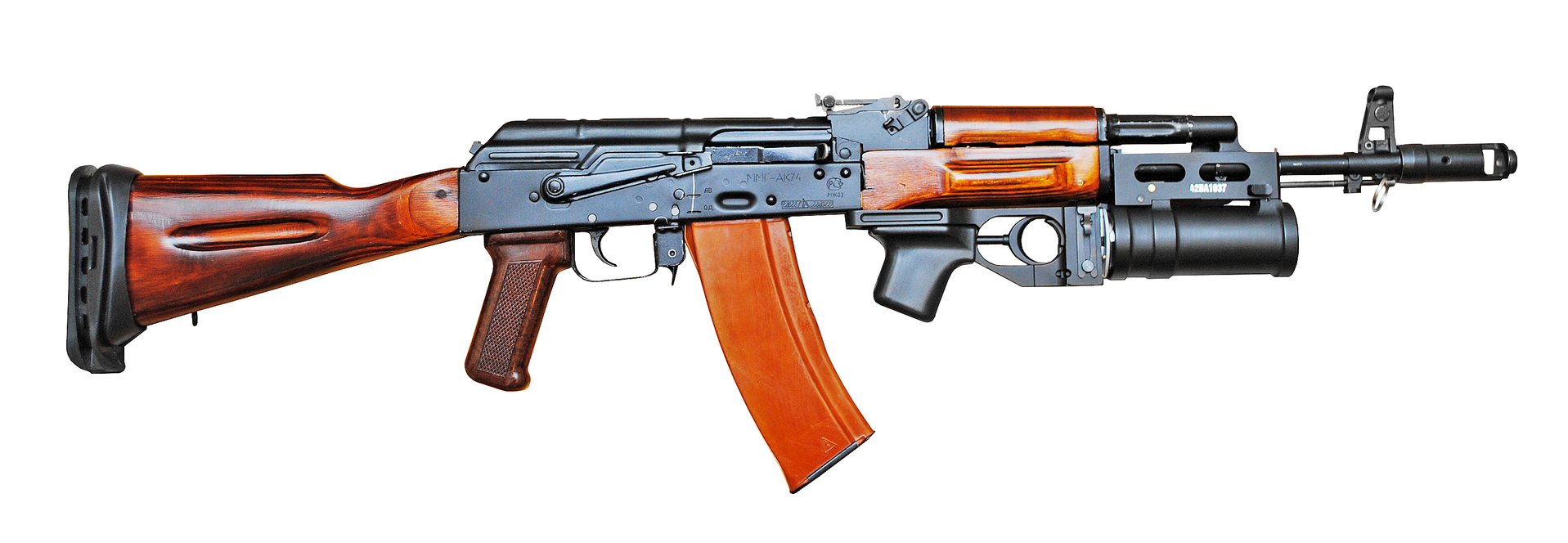
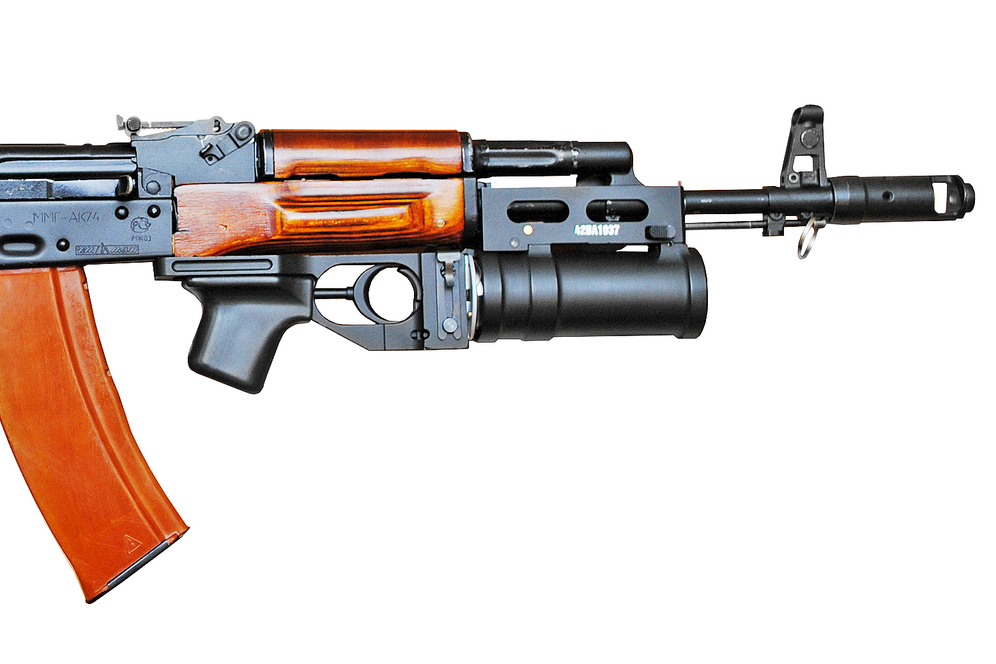
An AK-74 equipped with an airsoft replica of the GP-25 grenade launcher.

The development of a grenade launcher for the AKM assault rifle began in 1966 at the Central Design and Research Bureau of Sporting and Hunting Arms (TsKIB SOO). Development continued into the 1970s, and in 1978 it was accepted into service. The main production version was known as the GP-25, and could be attached to the AKM and AK-74 assault rifles. The GP-30 was made lighter and the aiming system was redesigned and moved to the right.

GP grenade launchers are similar in appearance and fire the same Russian 40mm caliber ammunition. At the top of the barrel is the mounting hardware to attach the weapon to the underside of a rifle barrel, from which it is designed to fire. The GP barrel has a useful life of about 400 rounds.

The GP-30 first entered service in 1989, and is intended for use with the AK-100 series of assault rifles. The GP-30M is a grenade launcher of simplified model, consisting of a shorter 40 mm rifled barrel in front of a basic trigger mechanism with minimal hand grip.

The current Izhmash-made version, the GP-34, has a further-redesigned sighting system located to the right side of the weapon and features the following advantages:

- Reliability: It is designed and tested specifically for the Kalashnikov assault rifles, fits such assault rifles directly without any adaptors or hand guard dismantling.
- Improved safety: The design prevents a round from moving within or falling out of the barrel, even if the muzzle is pointed down. The GP-34 features an additional mechanism (firing pin safety lever) to improve safety during loading.

=== Variants ===
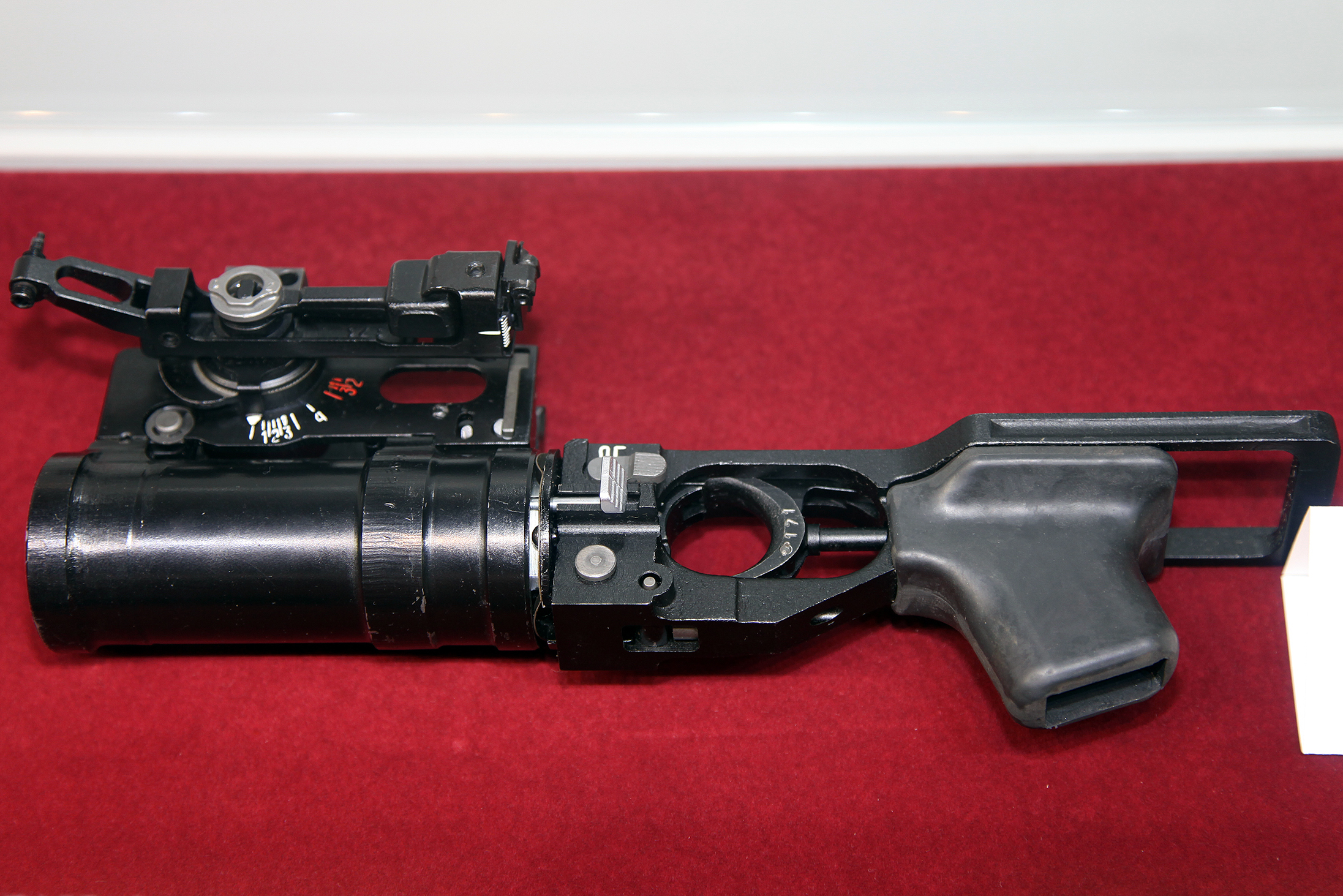
GP-25.

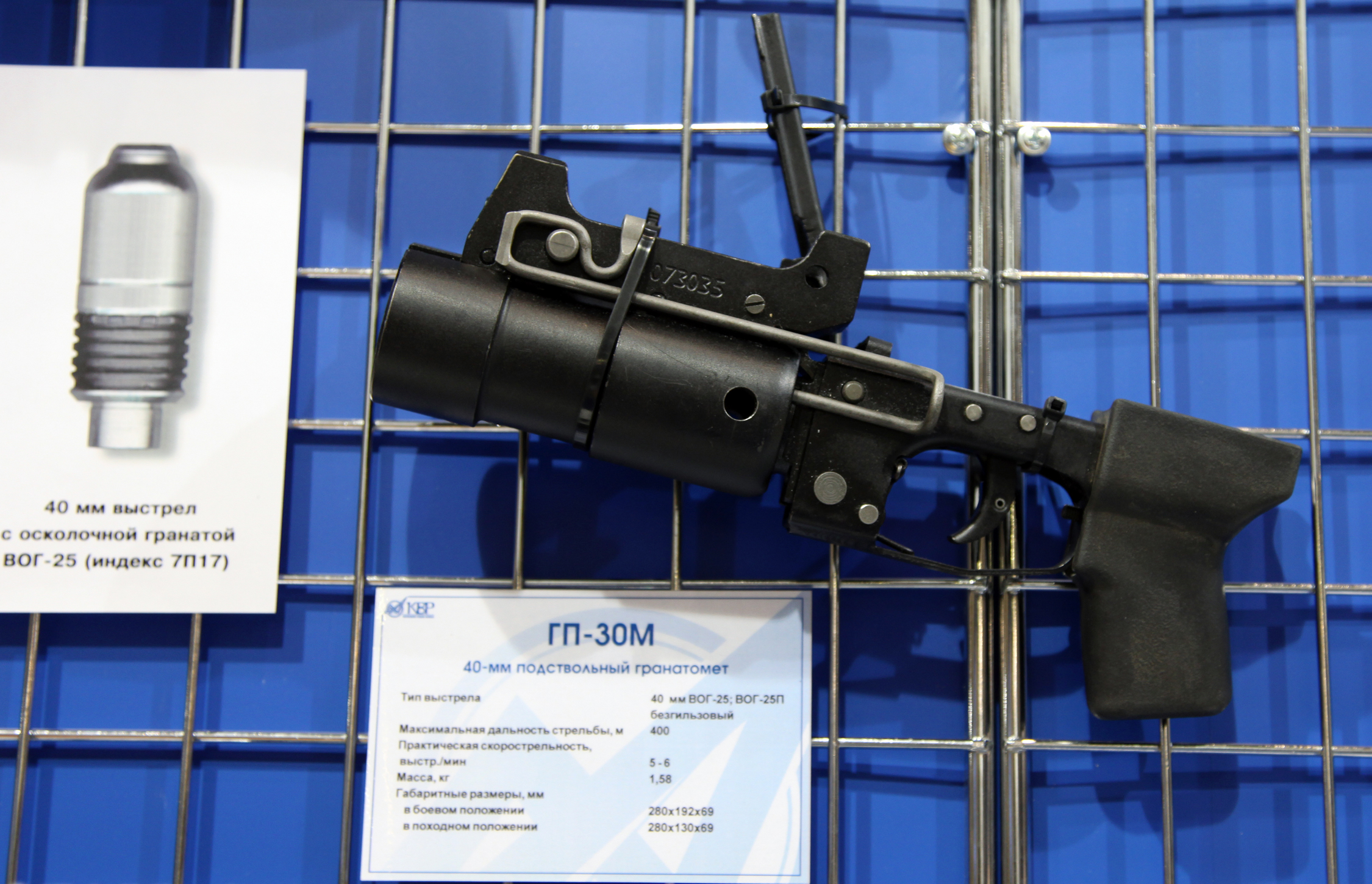
GP-30M.

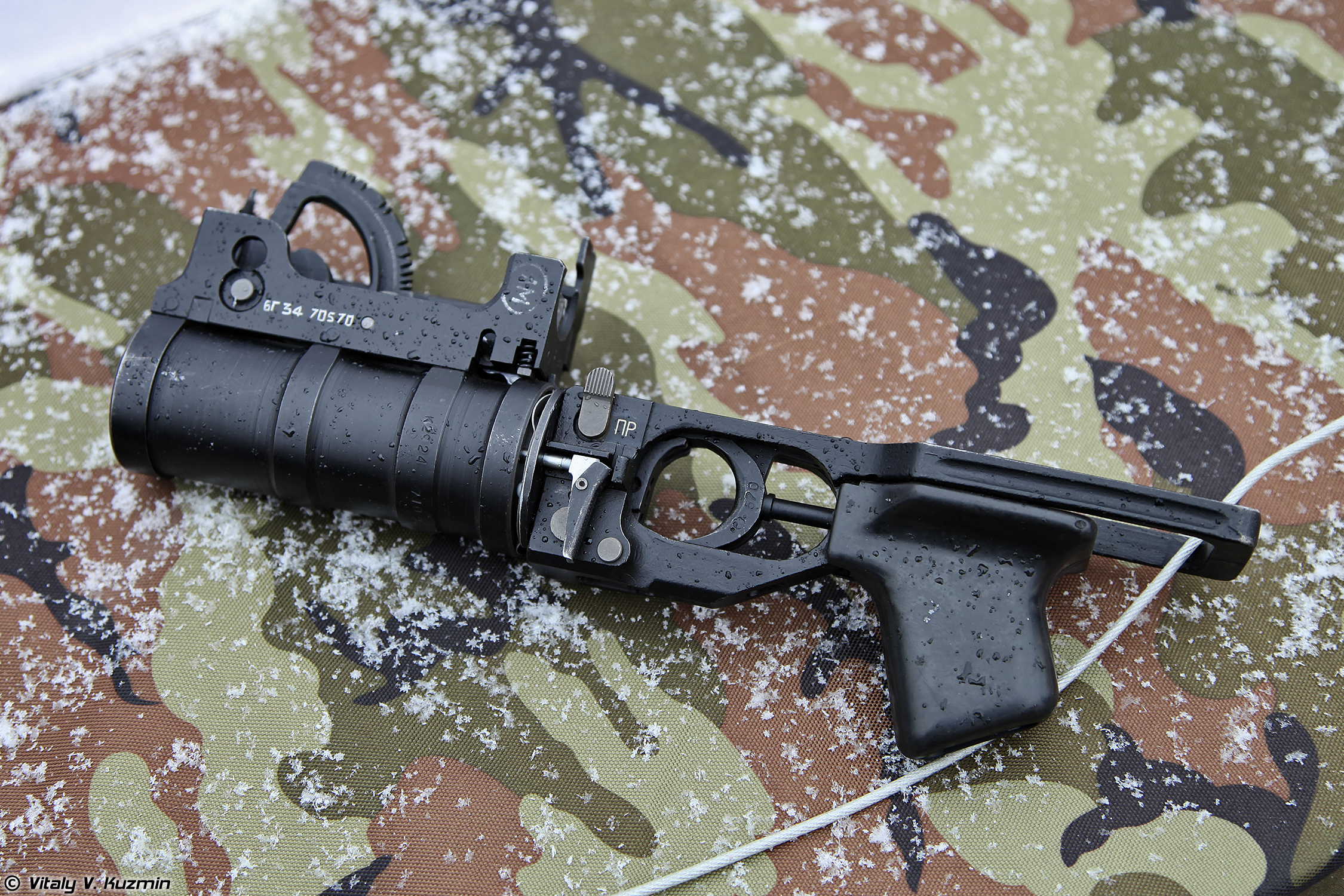
GP-34.
- ГП-25 (GP-25), GRAU index: 6Г15 (6G15), nickname «Костёр» (Kostyor, "Bonfire")
- ГП-30 (GP-30), GRAU index: 6Г21 (6G21), nickname «Обувка» (Obuvka, "Shoe")
- ГП-34 (GP-34), GRAU index: 6Г34 (6G34)

== Use ==
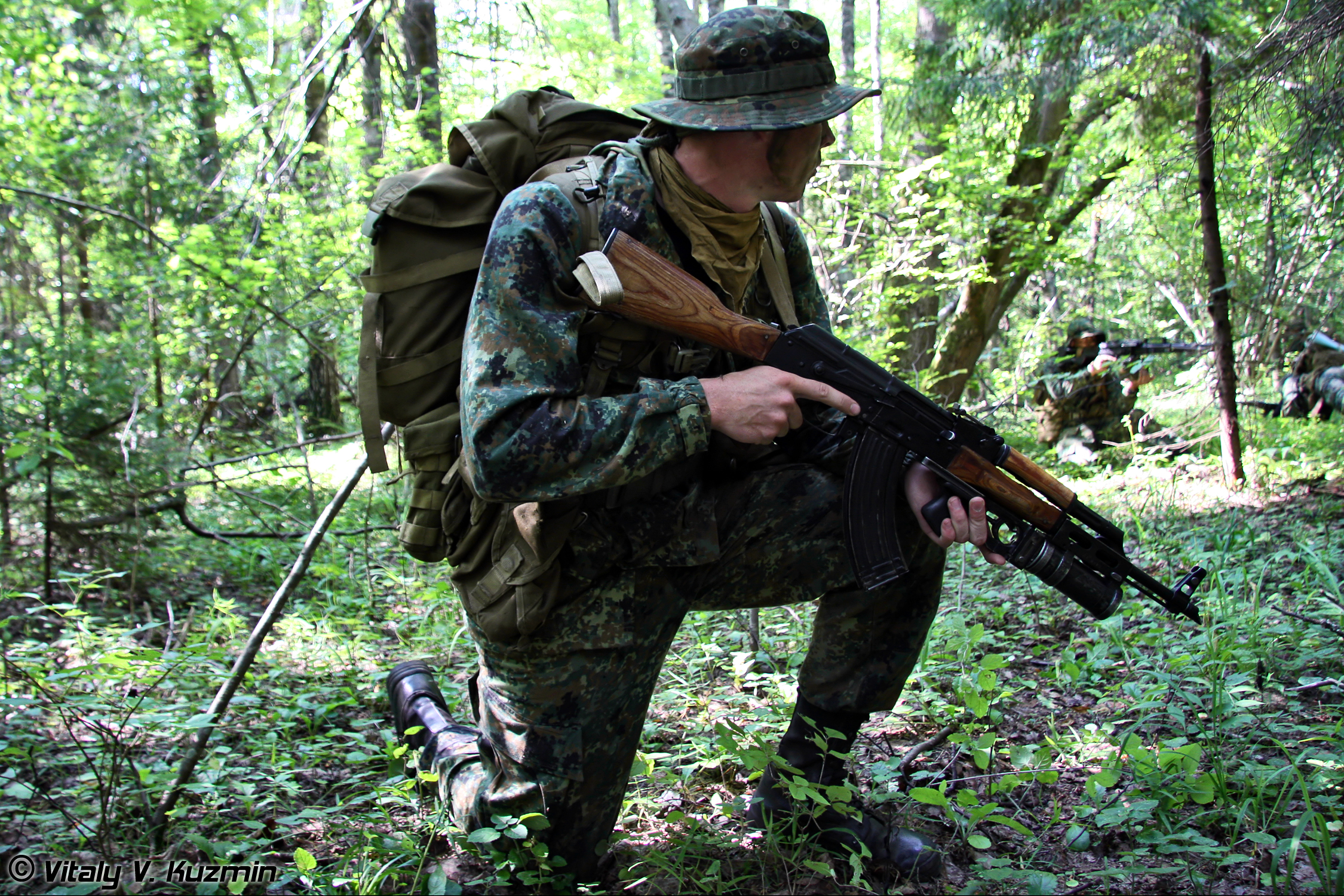
Spetsnaz with GP grenade launcher under an AKM rifle, 45th Spetsnaz Brigade.

A grenade is first loaded from the muzzle, the weapon is aimed, and then the double-action trigger is pulled to fire. This fires the percussion cap at the base of the grenade which activates the nitrocellulose propellant inside the grenade body. The hot, expanding gas from the propellant is forced through openings in the base of the grenade that move it along the barrel and, at the same time, force the driving band to fit into the twelve grooves of the rifle. The rifling provides stabilizing rotation to the projectile. The grenade has a range of up to 400m.

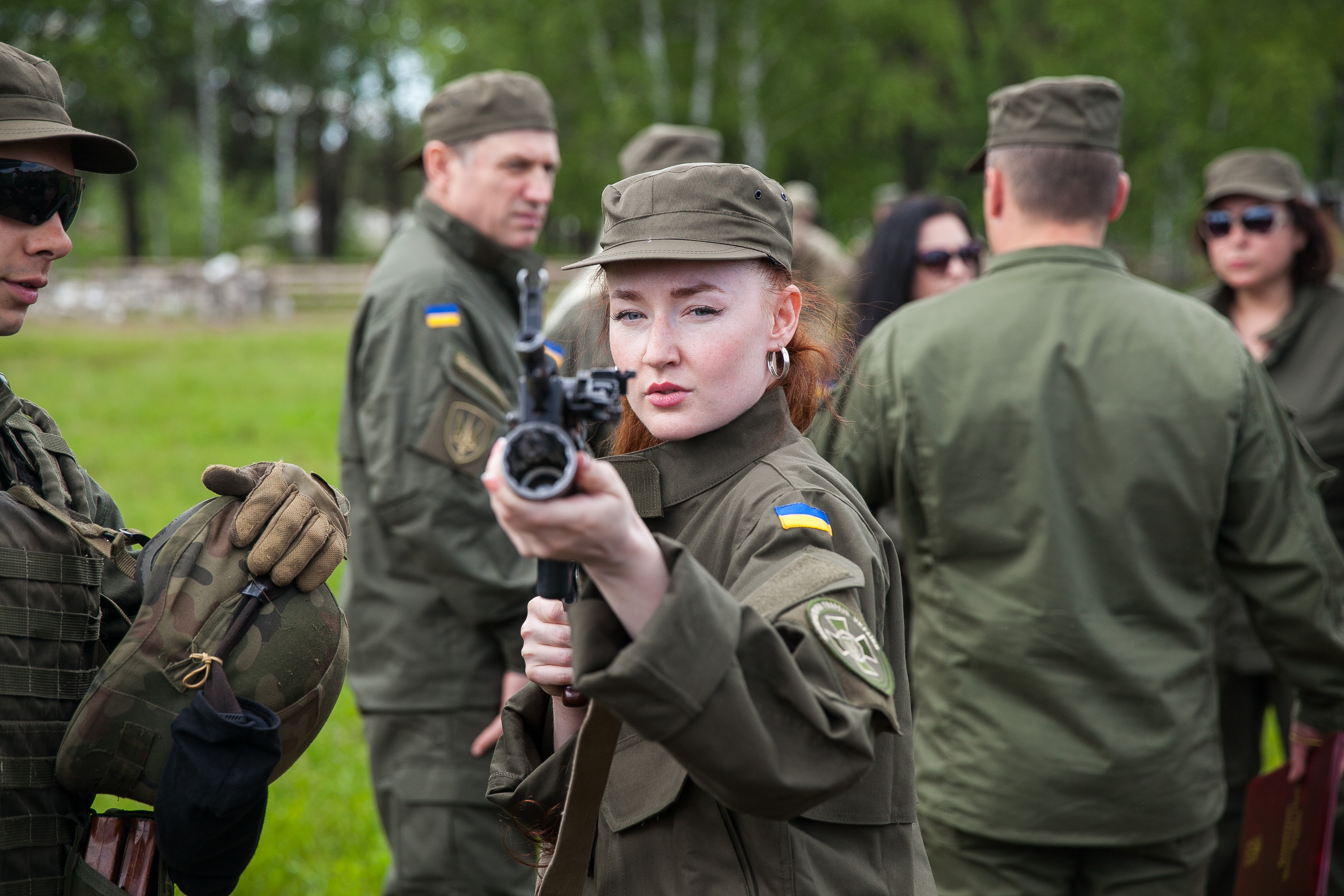
GP-25 sighting system.

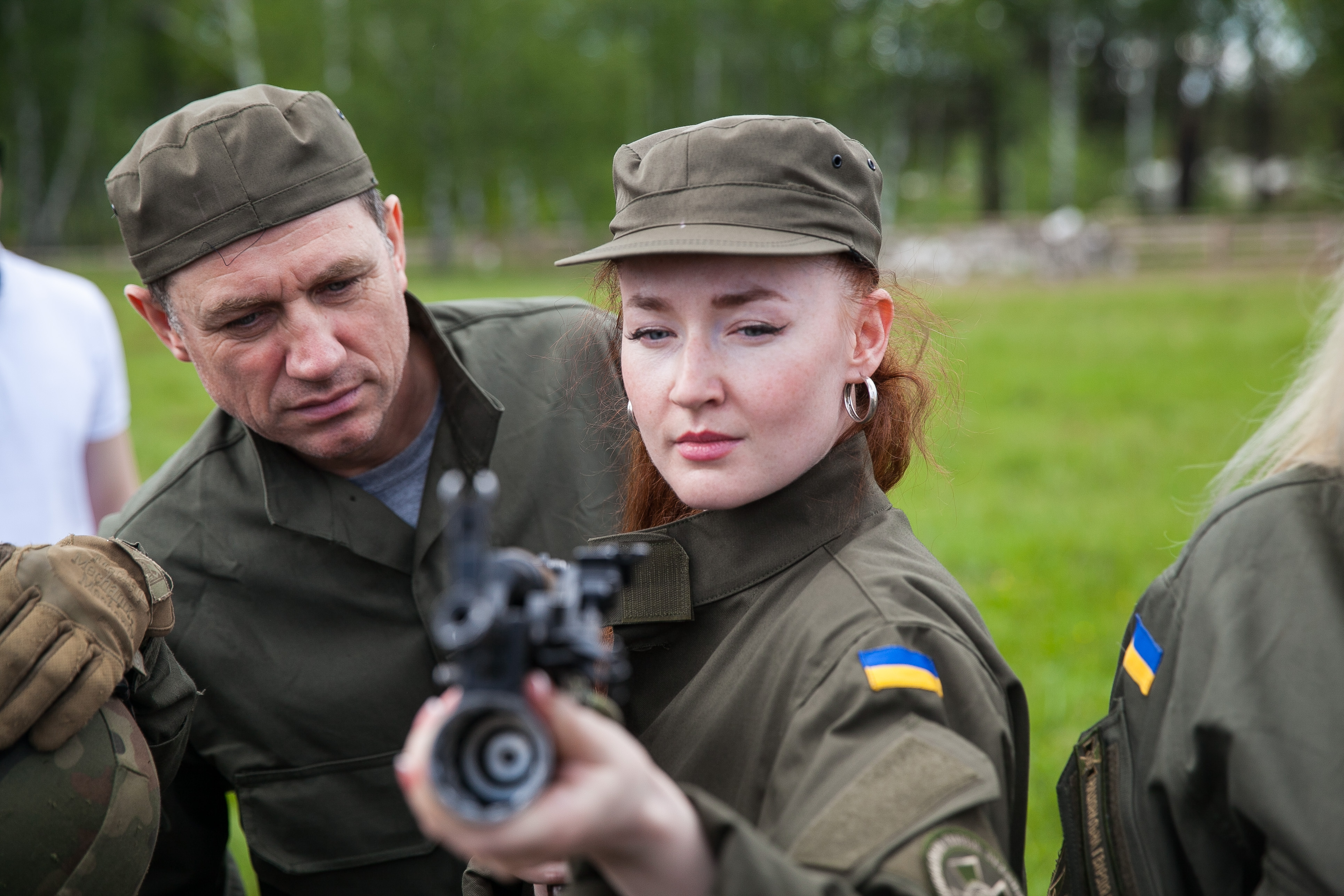
GP-25 seen from the front.

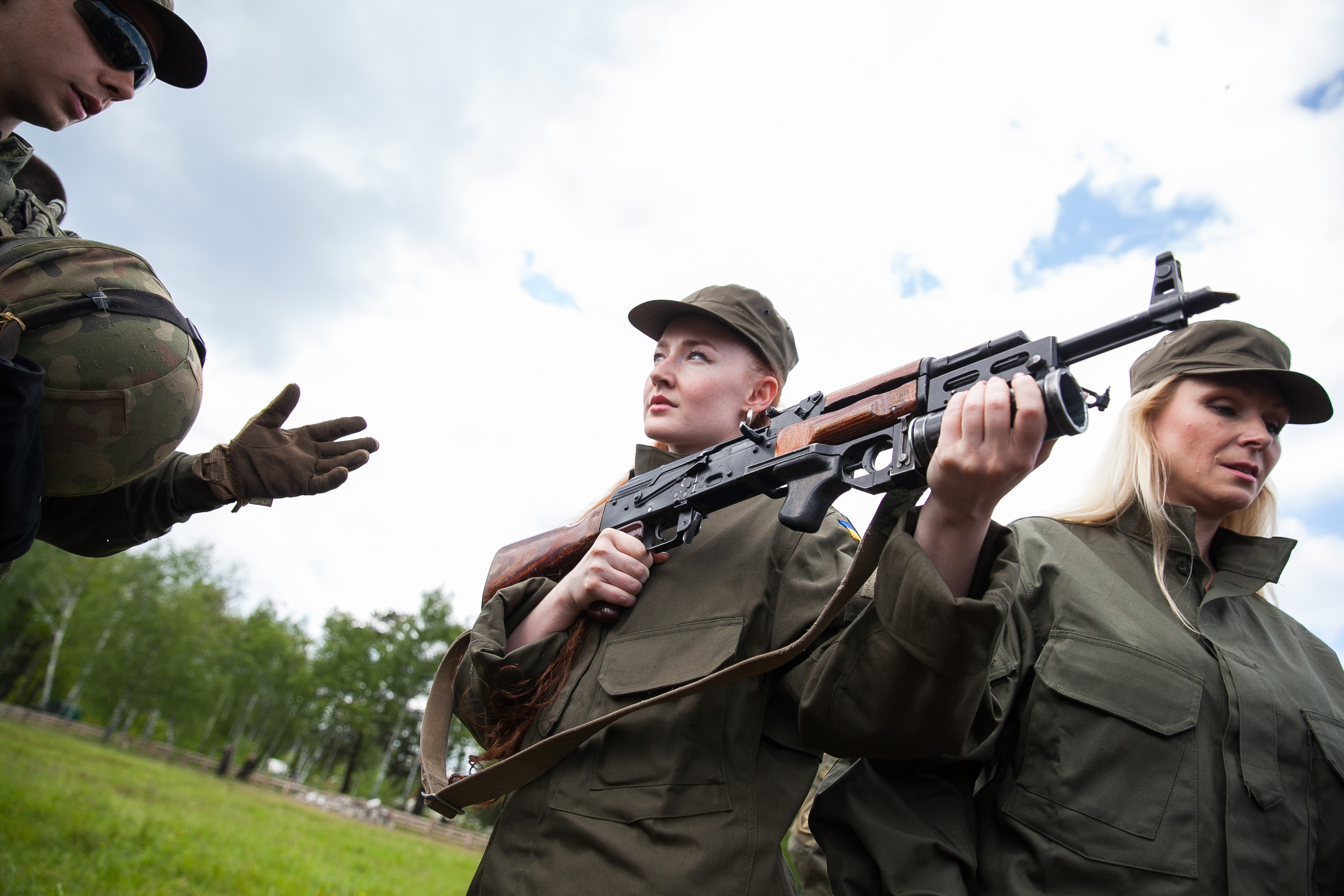
Ukraine soldiers explaining the use of the GP-25 grenade launcher.

== Ammunition ==
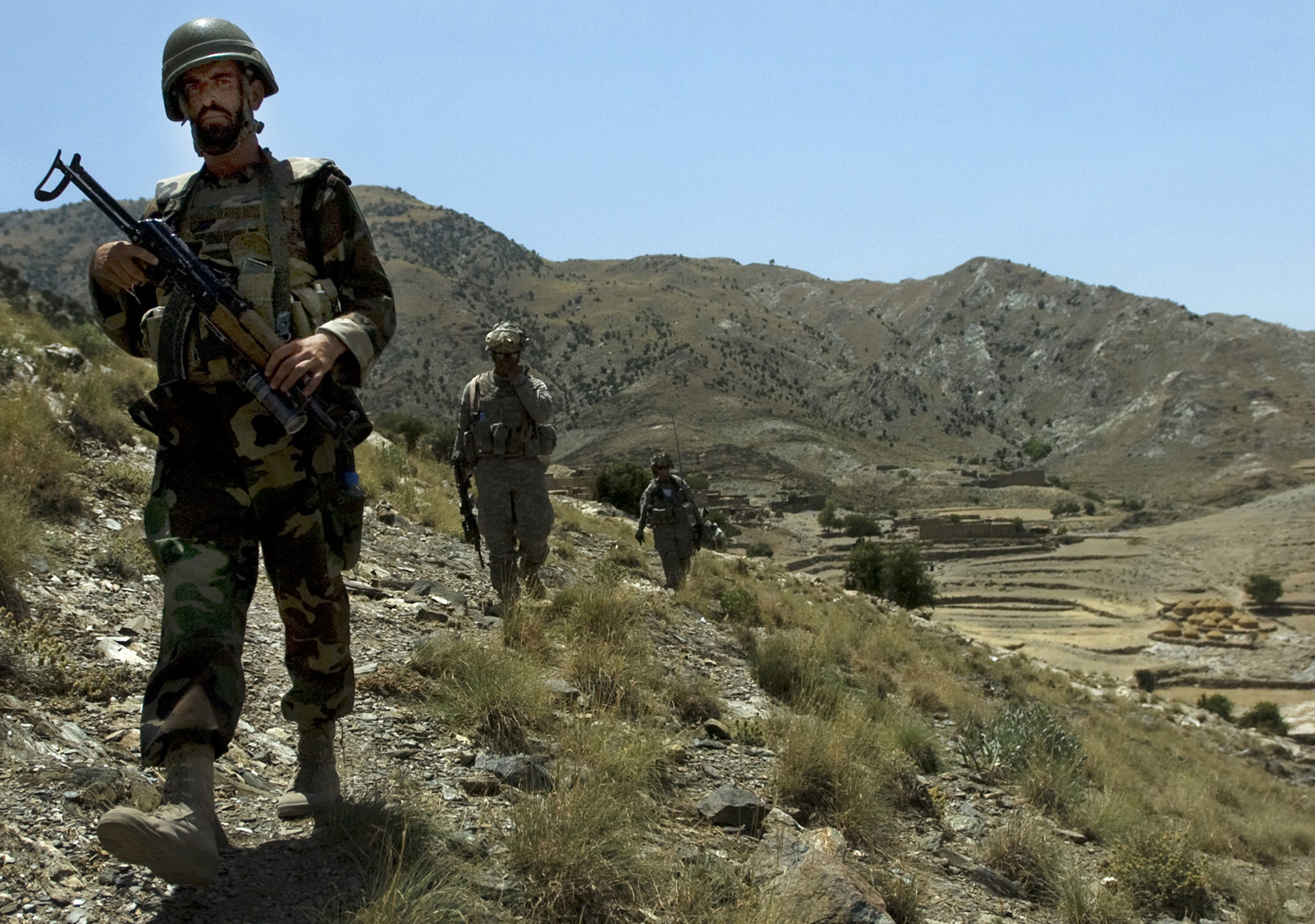
An Afghan National Army soldier armed with a GP-25/30 on patrol in Kunar province, Khas Kunar district of Afghanistan, July 1, 2009.

GP grenade launchers fire multiple 40mm VOG-25 high-explosive fragmentation grenades, with a total range of 400 m and an effective range of 150 m. These Russian-Soviet 40 mm grenades are not compatible with Western 40x46 mm grenades. Originally, the main grenade was the VOG-15 (7P17) fragmentation grenade, which has a lethal radius of six meters. Ammunition for the muzzle-loading GP-25 consists of a single piece containing propellant and charge, as opposed to the more traditional two-piece case and projectile design of comparable US 40x46mm ammunition used in breech-loading grenade launchers, such as the M203. This integral "caseless" design – with the propellant and primer contained in the base of the grenade – provides for when the grenade is fired nothing is left in the barrel, so the operator can load the next grenade.

A bouncing grenade, the VOG-25P, is also available. On impact, a small charge in the nose of the grenade explodes; this raises the grenade 50 cm to 1.5 m in the air, before an impact delay fuse causes it to detonate. The VOG-25P also has a lethal radius of six meters. The new generation VOG-M and VOG-PM ammunition, with an increased effectiveness of no less than 1.5 times, are now serially available.

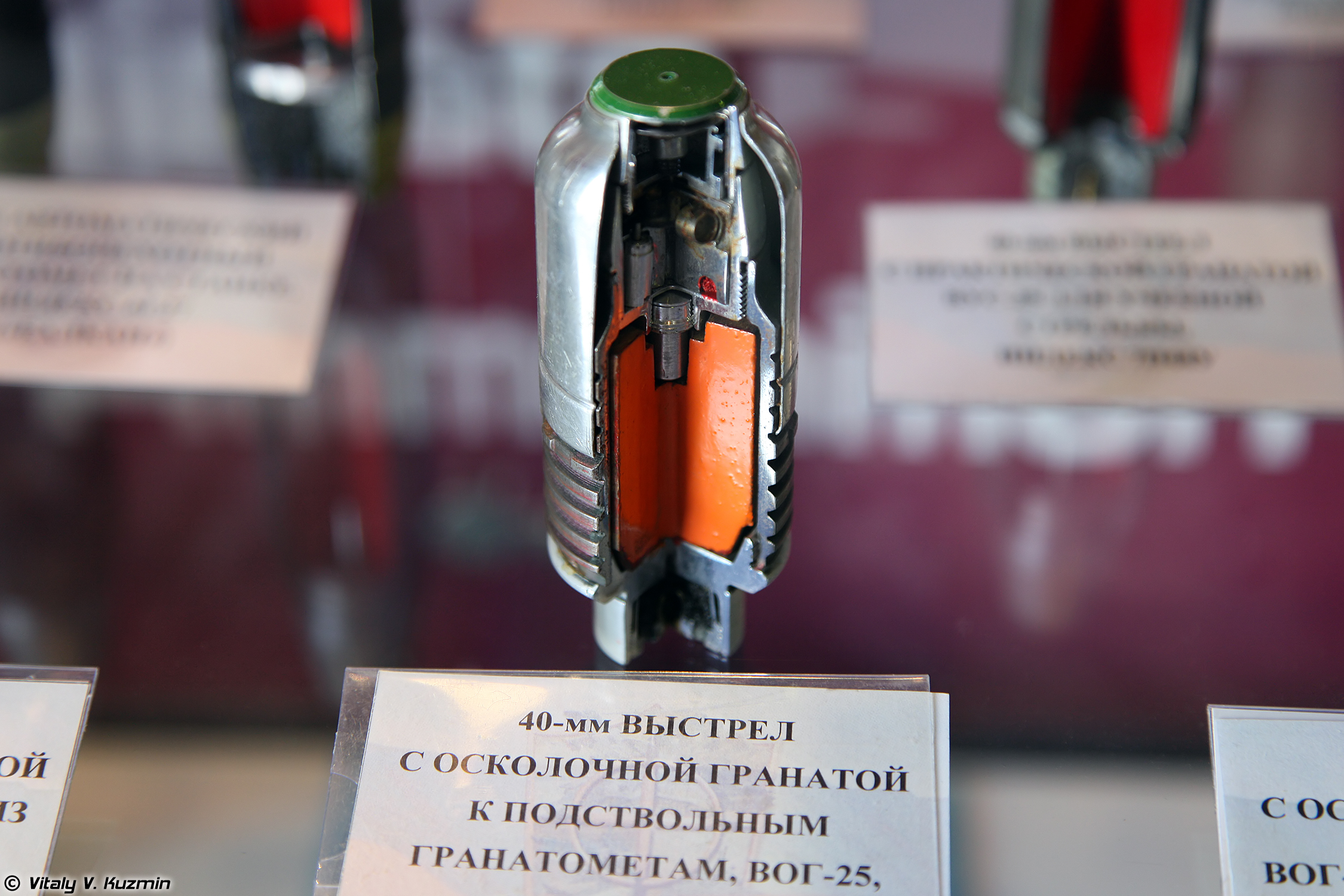
Internal view of the 40mm VOG-25 (7P17) grenade from the GP-25 grenade launcher.

Smoke grenades are also available. The original GRD-40 grenade was replaced by a series of grenades designed for use at different ranges. These are the GRD-50, GRD-100 and GRD-200 intended for use at 50, 100 and 200 meters respectively. They are capable of producing a 20 cubic meter cloud of smoke that lasts for one minute in winds of up to five meters per second. A tear gas grenade called Gvozd ("Nail") and a stick grenade are also available.

Today it is used primarily by the Russian Armed Forces in weapons such as the GP-34, BG-15 Mukha and RG-6. Several types exist but the most common version is the default VOG-25 high-explosive version.

=== Ammunition data ===
Version	Fuse arming range	Fuse self-destruction time	Weight	Charge
VOG-25	10–40 m (33–130 ft)	14–19 s	250 g (0.55 lb)	48 g of A-IX-1 explosive
VOG-25P	10–40 m (33–130 ft)	14–19 s	278 g (0.61 lb)	37 g of TNT
GRD-50/100/200	10–40 m (33–130 ft)	14–19 s	265 g	90 g

== Users ==
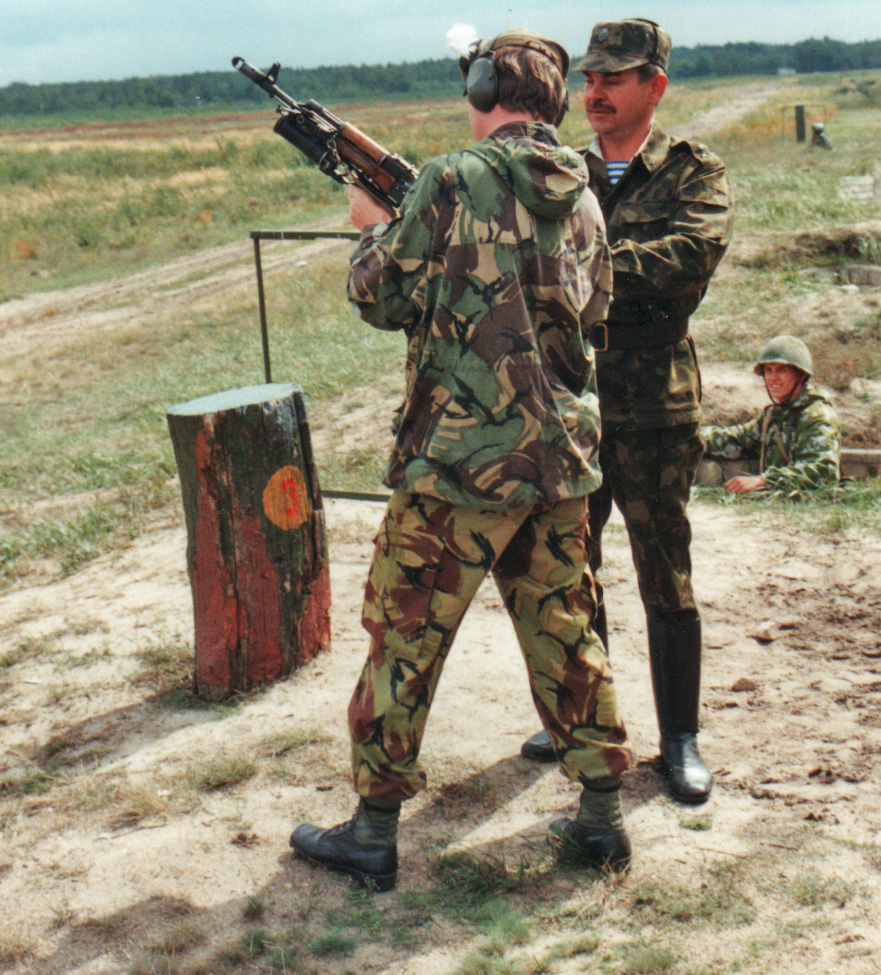
A group of British officers participating in a Russian field day at the WGF HQ camp in Zossen-Wuensdorf, Germany, 1992. Here Colonel Pugachov, CO 69th Guards Motor Rifle Regiment, is preparing a British officer for firing the GP 25/30 grenade launcher mounted on an AK-74.

- Algeria
- Angola
- Armenia: GP-30
- Botswana
- Bulgaria: Made under license by Arsenal AD as the UBGL and the UBGL-1.
- Burundi
- Congo-Kinshasa
- Cyprus
- Georgia: Made by STC Delta.
- Greece: Used for the AK-74M.
- India
- Indonesia: Mobile Brigade Corps
- Iran : Used by IRGC
- Lithuania: Lithuanian Armed Forces
- North Korea
- Pakistan
- Russia
- Serbia: Made under license by Zastava Arms as the PBG – 40 mm and the PBG 40 mm M70.
- North Macedonia
- Syria: Uses both GP-25s and GP-30Ms.
- Ukraine
- Vietnam

== See also ==
- BS-1 Tishina
- QLG-10
- RGM-40 Kastet grenade launcher is a stand-alone version of GP-30 grenade launcher
- Wz. 1974 Pallad grenade launcher

== Bibliography ==
- Koll, Christian (2009). Soviet Cannon: A Comprehensive Study of Soviet Arms and Ammunition in Calibres 12.7mm to 57mm. Linz, Austria: Christian Koll. p. 397. ISBN 978-3-200-01445-9. OCLC 424511896.
- Rottman, Gordon L. (2011). The AK-47: Kalashnikov-series assault rifles. Weapon 8. Oxford: Osprey Publishing. ISBN 978-1-84908-835-0. OCLC 651902408.
