= Mirage-class patrol vessel =

Class overview
- Name: Mirage class
- Builders: Vympel Shipyard
- Operators: Russian Coast Guard
- In commission: 2001
- Completed: 3
- Active: 3

General characteristics
- Type: Fast patrol craft
- Displacement: 120.3 t (118.4 long tons; 132.6 short tons)
- Length: 35.45 m (116.3 ft)
- Beam: 6.6 m (22 ft)
- Draft: 2.7 m (8.9 ft)
- Speed: Max: 50 kn (93 km/h; 58 mph)
- Range: 1500 nmi (8 knots)
- Endurance: 10 days
- Complement: 12
- Sensors & processing systems: Surface search I-band radar; Low-light level camera; Nvigational radar; Other navigation and communication systems
- Armament: 1 × 30 mm AK-306; 8 × Igla MANPADS; 2 × 14.5 mm MTPU machine guns; 1 × Shturm missile system, 6 Ataka missiles (not installed); Small arms

The Mirage-class patrol vessel, also known as Project 14310, is a Russian Coast Guard vessel. The patrol craft is designed to operate in coastal areas, ports, and other littoral areas, to perform missions like protection of territorial maritime borders, law enforcement, counter-terrorism, detection and intercept smugglers or other threats, search and rescue, and protection of fisheries.

== Design ==
The patrol craft have a modern design with crew comforts like low noise levels, and AC. The patrol craft have higher levels of survivability over some patrol craft due to various features like water-tight compartmentalization which allows the vessel to stay afloat even if one compartment is completely flooded, other important things like the engines are shock mounted, the use of fire-proof and fire-resistant materials, and back-up power supplies. The patrol crafts armament allows the craft to engage surface, ground, and air targets, and can have an additional missile system installed. The 30 mm gun is controlled by a Kolonka ring sight fire control director. The patrol craft also carry a small boat for boarding operations, search and rescue, or other missions.

== See also ==
- List of ships of Russia by project number
