= GM-94 =

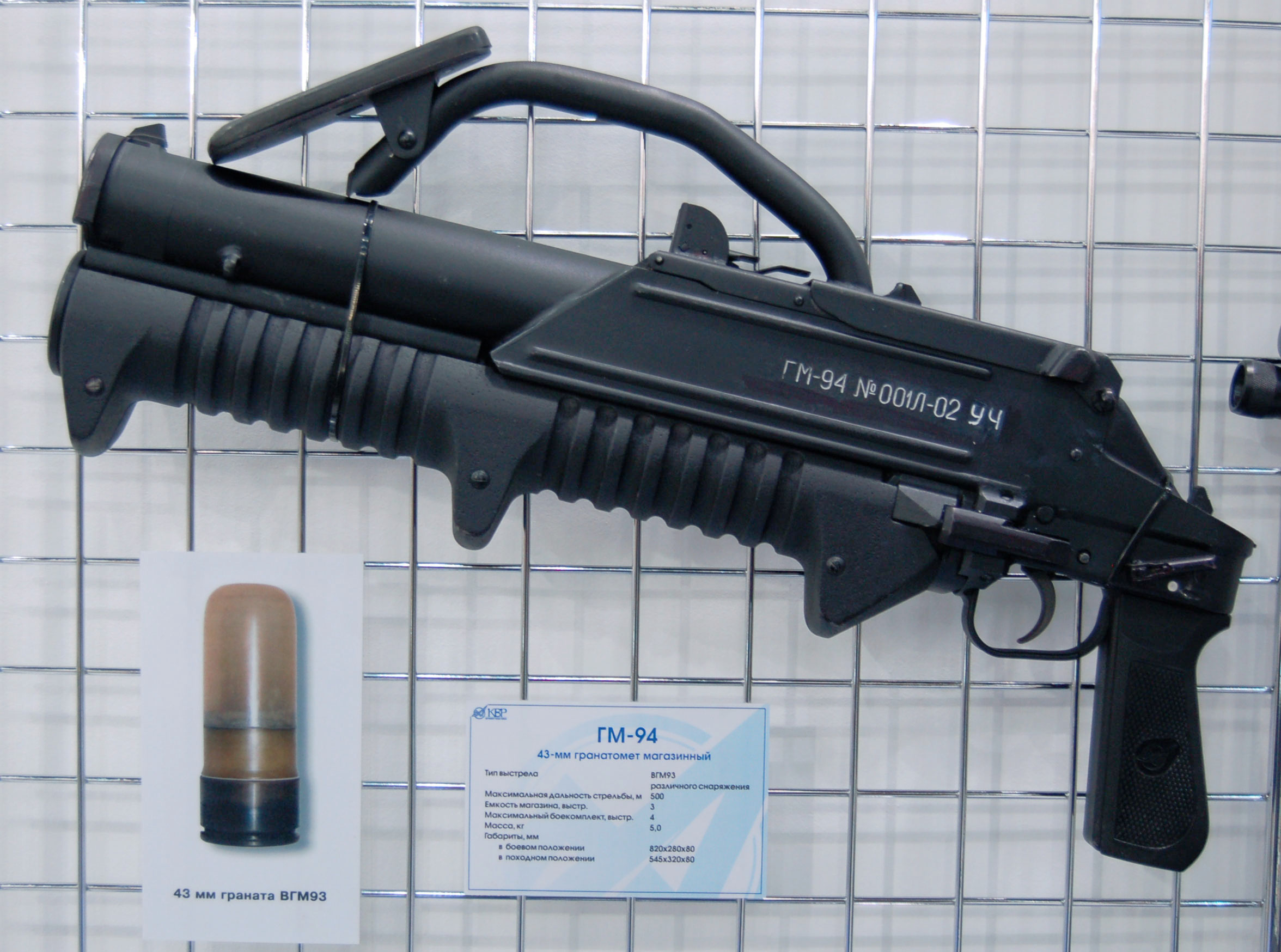
- GM-94
- Type: Pump action grenade launcher
- Place of origin: Russia

Service history
- Used by: Spetsnaz, FSB, MVD and National Guard
- Wars: 2005 raid on Nalchik; Libyan Civil War; Annexation of Crimea by the Russian Federation; Russo-Ukrainian war

Production history
- Designer: KBP
- Manufacturer: KBP

Specifications
- Mass: 4.8 kg (10.6 lb) unloaded 5.8 kg (12.8 lb) loaded
- Length: 810 mm (31.9 in) stock extended 540 mm (21.3 in) stock folded
- Cartridge: 43×30mm
- Action: Double action
- Muzzle velocity: 85 m/s (280 ft/s)
- Effective firing range: 300 m (330 yd)
- Maximum firing range: 500 m (550 yd)
- Feed system: 3 round pump action above-barrel tubular magazine
- Sights: Iron sights

The GM-94 (Russian: Гранатомет Магазинный образца 1994, Granatomet Magazinnyy obraztsa 1994, lit. "magazine-fed grenade launcher, model of 1994") is a pump action grenade launcher for use by Russian special and security forces. Development of the GM-94 grenade launcher began in 1993, under the guidance of Vasilij Gryazev, chief designer of the KBP design bureau (Konstruktorskoye Byuro Priborostroyeniya; (Конструкторское Бюро Приборостроения; KBP), in Tula, Russia.

== Description ==
The GM-94 is a short range weapon, allowing it to be used in close urban environments. With a minimum safe distance of only 10 meters, the GM-94 is well suited to close, room-to-room fighting. Its simple design and operation allows it to operate in dusty and dirty environments and even after being immersed in water.

The launcher is capable of firing VGM-93.900 high explosive fragmentation, VGM-93.100 thermobaric, VGM-93.300 smoke and VGM-93.200 tear gas canisters, VGM-93.600 rubber slugs and other non-lethal payloads.

The VGM-93.100 thermobaric grenade contains around 160 grams of explosive filler. It can penetrate up to 8 mm of mild steel or interior wall with its blast, while producing minimal primary fragmentation.

== History ==
In June 2005, GM-94 with thermobaric VGM-93.100 ammunition was adopted by the Russian Ministry of Internal Affairs. In October 2007, the Russian armed forces adopted the launcher designated as LPO-97 (Legkiy Pekhotnyy Ognemet; Легкий Пехотный Огнемет; ‘light infantry flamethrower’) developed in the KBP Instrument Design Bureau on the basis of the GM-94 with a thermobaric grenade, in 2008 GM-94 was adopted for the branches of the Federal Security Service. The weapon was used in the battle of Nalchik in 2005 and in Crimea 2014. Though the launcher was initially intended for use by Russian security forces, the GM-94 has been spotted as far afield as Kazakhstan, where it is in service with the Kazakhstani paramilitary police tactical unit Sunkar ("Hawk") and in the hands of non-state combatants during the overthrow of the Gaddafi regime in Libya 2011.

Russian forces have used this weapon to fire non-lethal tear gas grenades on protesters in Ukraine in March 2022.

== Users ==
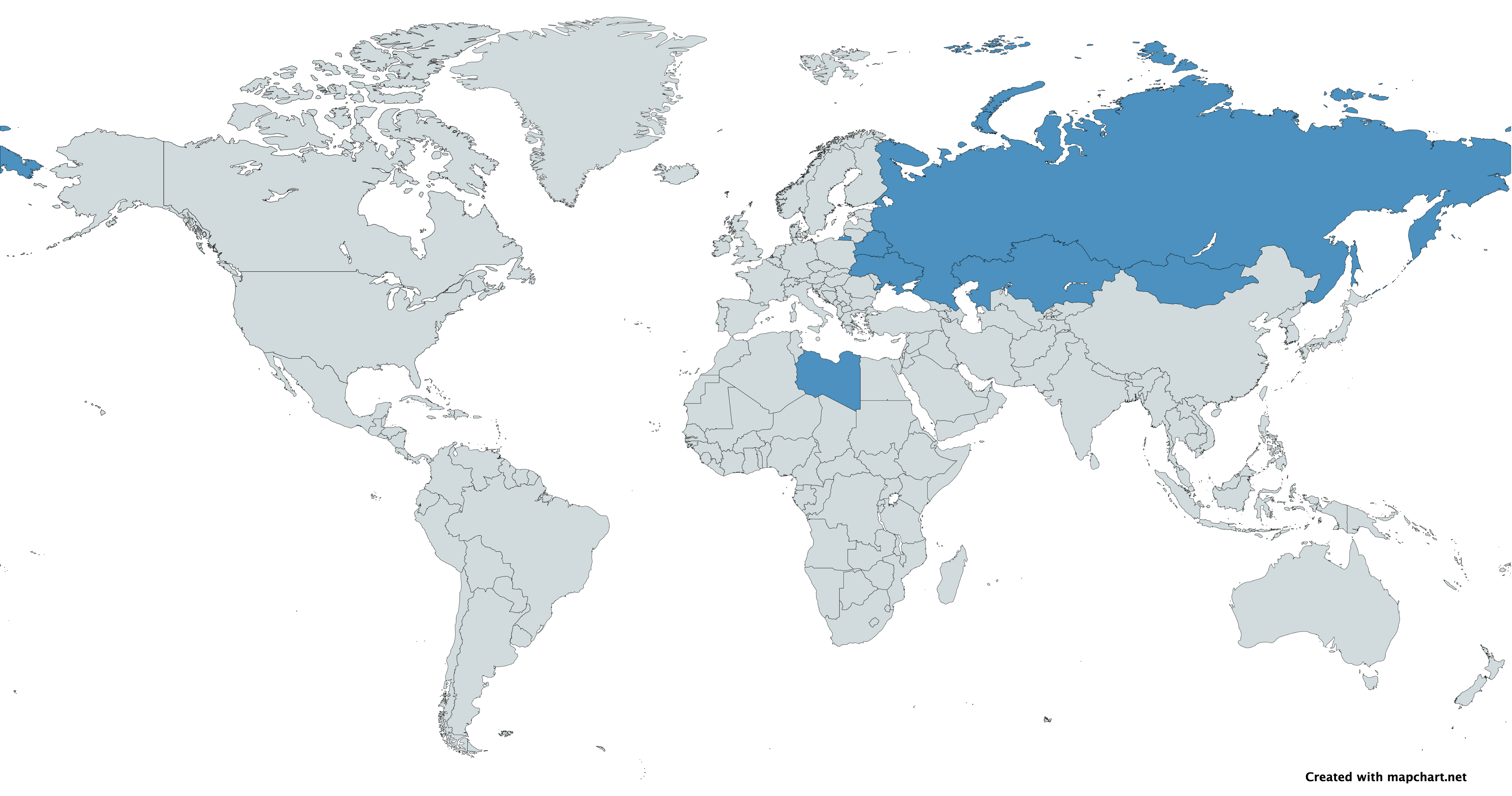
Map with GM-94 users in blue

- Belarus
- Kazakhstan
- Libya
- Mongolia
- Russian Federation
- Ukraine

== See also ==
- China Lake grenade launcher – (United States)
- DP-64 – (Soviet Union)
- Neopup PAW-20 – (South Africa)
- RG-6 grenade launcher – (Russia, Soviet Union)
- RGM-40 Kastet – (Russia)
- RGS-50M – (Russia, Soviet Union)
- RGSh-30 – (Ukraine)
