= Vympel Shipyard =

Russian company

Coordinates: 58.06516196762985°N 38.80180376512484°E

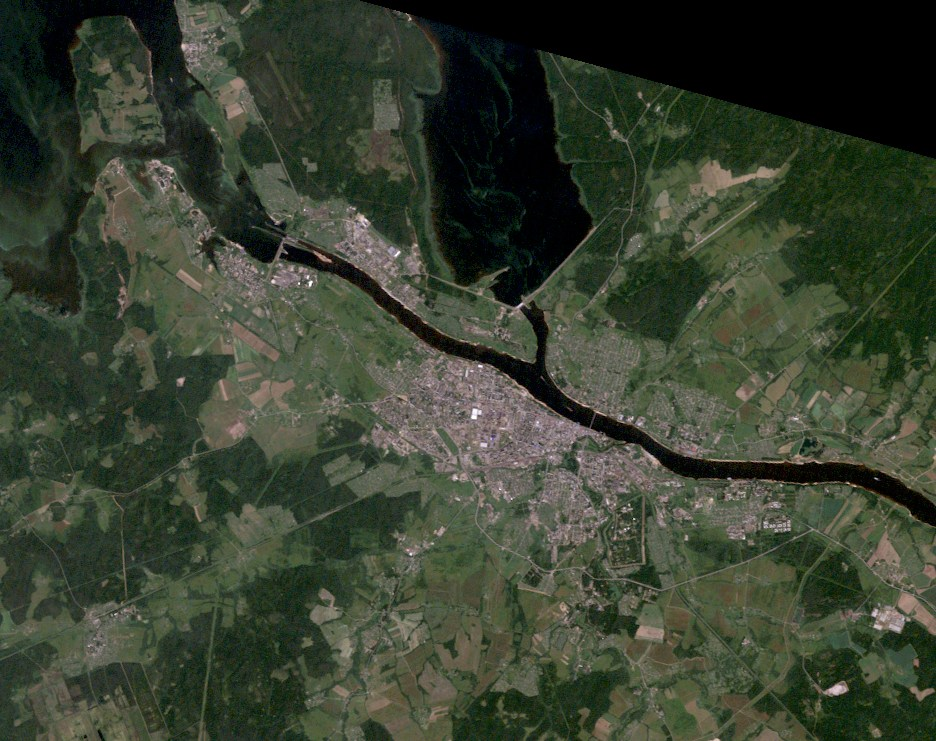
- Formerly: Plant No. 341
- Type: Joint-stock company
- Industry: Shipbuilding
- Founded: 1930; 96 years ago
- Headquarters: Rybinsk, Yaroslavl Oblast, Russia
- Area served: International
- Key people: Norenko Evgeniy Ivanovich
- Products: Naval ships
- Number of employees: 1500
- Parent: United Shipbuilding Corporation

JSC Vympel Shipyard is a Russian shipbuilding company located in the city of Rybinsk, Yaroslavl Region. The enterprise is part of United Shipbuilding Corporation (USC).

It is a shipbuilding company specializing in the production of medium and low-tonnage sea and river vessels and boats built from steel and aluminum-magnesium alloys. Products are supplied to for export on the domestic market.

At present, Vympel serially manufactures new-generation combat missile and patrol boats, high-speed search and rescue, firefighting, hydrographic, tug and other specialized vessels, providing warranty and service maintenance for its products.

== Background ==
The company was founded in 1930 and initially specialized in the production of motor boats. During the Great Patriotic War, the plant produced long-range torpedo boats. These are the first large steel-hulled torpedo boats in the country.

After the end of the war, the enterprise carried out the construction of road minesweepers with a displacement of 100-300 tons and fire boats. In the 60s, marine hydrographic boats were produced, motor ships T-63M were in a large series.

In 1963, the first missile boat of Project 205 was commissioned. Over the next 12 years, 64 units were built. These boats, equipped with P-15 cruise missiles, have shown themselves vividly in local conflicts in the Middle East and the Indian Ocean and led to a boat boom in world shipbuilding.

In 1973, the head boat of the new Project 205ER was built at the plant. Within 12 years, 86 boats were produced, which were delivered to the countries of Europe, Asia, Africa and Latin America.

In 1980, the lead missile boat of Project 1241RE was commissioned. In the 80s, this boat was at the level of the best world standards in terms of its armament, and surpassed the best foreign models in terms of driving performance and power plant, but by the beginning of the 2000s it was very outdated, while retaining, however, significant opportunities for modernization.

Over the long history, the plant has built more than 30 thousand boats of various types. For almost 40 years, the main products have been exported, during which time more than 1800 boats have been exported to 29 countries of the world.

== Naval ships ==
Naval ships built by Vympel Shipyard include:

- Project 12421 corvettes
- Project 12418 corvettes
- Project 14310 patrol boats
- Project 12150 patrol boats
- Project 21850 patrol boats
- Project 19910 hydrographic vessels
- Project 19920 hydrographic survey vessels
- Project 21980E anti-saboteur ships

Civil service ships built by Vympel Shipyard include:

- Project 12150M patrol boats
- Project 1496M1 patrol boats
- Project 23160 hydrofoils
- Т30В fishing trawlers
- Pleasure boats made of composite materials
