= RG-6 grenade launcher =

RG-6 (6G30)
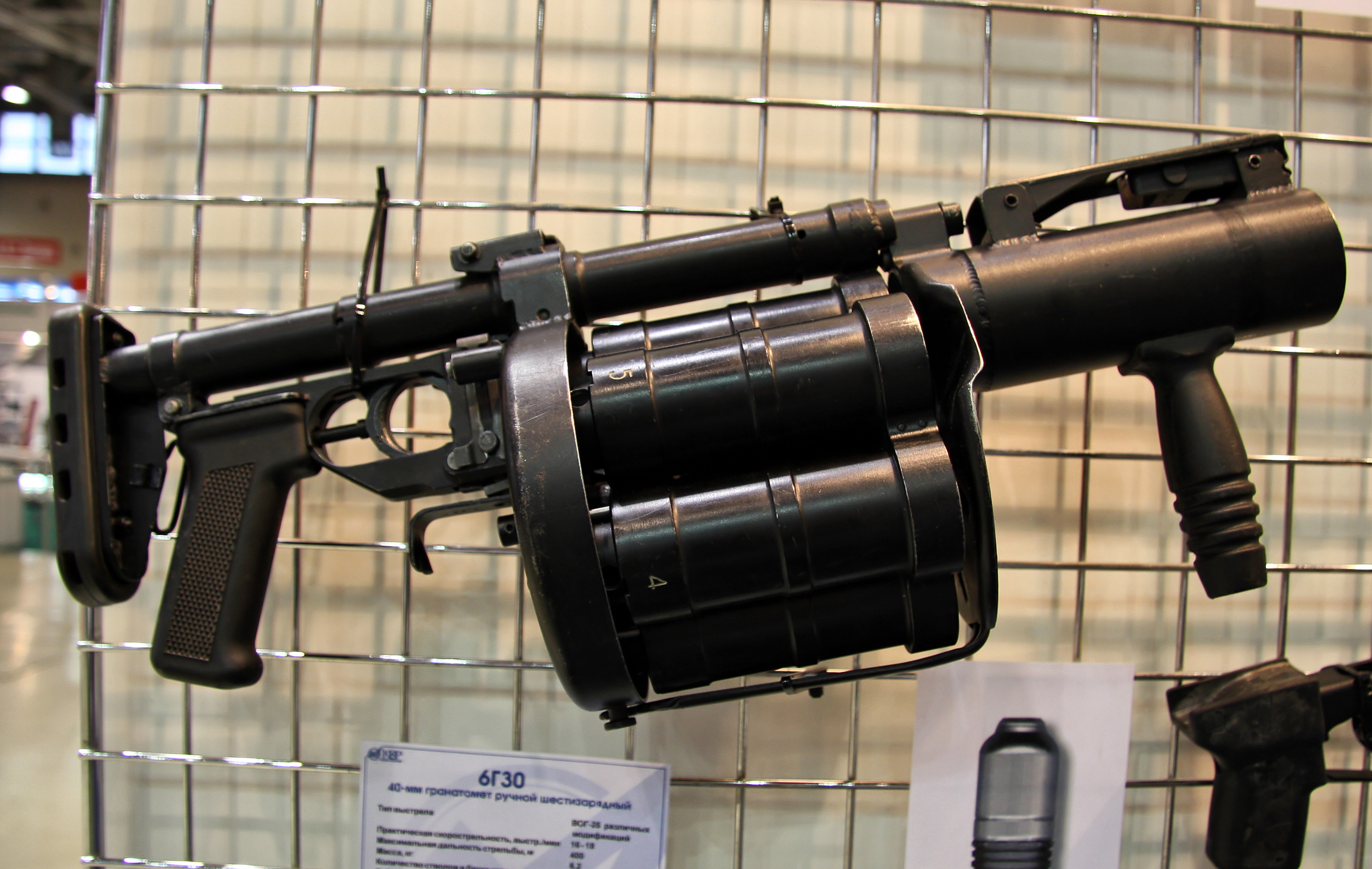
- Type: Revolver grenade launcher
- Place of origin: Russia

Service history
- In service: 1994–present
- Used by: Russia
- Wars: First Chechen War; Second Chechen War; Syrian Civil War; War in Iraq (2013-2017); Russo-Ukraine War

Production history
- Designer: TsKIB SOO Valery Nicolayevich Telesh
- Designed: 1993–1994
- Produced: 1994–present

Specifications
- Mass: 6.2 kg (13.67 lb)
- Length: 690 mm (27 in) stock extended / 520 mm (20.5 in) stock folded
- Width: 145 mm (5.7 in)
- Height: 280 mm (11 in) in combat / 200 mm (7.9 in) in travelling
- Cartridge: 40 mm caseless grenades
- Action: Double action
- Rate of fire: 2 rounds/sec (rapid fire); 16-18 rounds/min (sustained)
- Muzzle velocity: 76.5 m/s (251 ft/s)
- Maximum firing range: 400 m (1,300 ft)
- Feed system: 6-Round, Revolving, Swing Out-Type Cylinder
- Sights: folded, ladder-type rear sight

The RG-6 (GRAU designation 6G30) is a Russian 40 mm, six-shot, revolver-type grenade launcher developed between 1993 and 1994 by Central Design and Research Bureau of Sporting and Hunting Weapons (TsKIB SOO), Tula, Russia.

== History ==
The RG-6 was required to increase the firepower of the infantry during urban combat, seen in small-scale conflicts, such as the Chechen wars. The RG-6 entered limited production by the mid-1990s and is now in use by various elements of Russian Army and special forces such as those in the MVD.

== Design ==
RG-6 is designed to fire all standard 40mm "caseless" grenades, available for the general issue GP-25 underbarrel launcher. The design of the RG-6 is, apparently, heavily influenced by the South African Milkor MGL grenade launcher, with some differences. The key difference is that the RG-6 uses "caseless" rounds, and thus its cylinder chambers are loaded from the front. The "barrel" is, in fact, a smoothbore tube, which serves only as a support for the front grip and sights.

The double-action only trigger unit is also modified from GP-25, with a manual safety and several automatic safeties.

The cylinder is rotated using a clockwork-type spring, which is manually wound during reloading. For reloading, the front cylinder plate with the "barrel" tube is unlocked from the frame and then rotated sideways, to expose the front of the cylinder. Each chamber in the cylinder is a separate muzzle-loading rifled barrel, similar in design to the GP-25 barrel.

The sights are folded for more convenient carry and storage, with a ladder-type rear sight. The buttstock is fitted with a rubber recoil pad, and when it is not in use, it is telescoped into the frame.

== Users ==
- Armenia
- Mongolia
- Russia
- Syria

=== Non-state users ===
- Islamic State

== See also ==
- List of grenade launchers
- List of Russian weaponry
- Milkor MGL – (South Africa)
- Granatnik RGP-40 – (Poland)
- Hawk MM-1 – (United States)
- RGA-86 – (Poland)
- RGM-40 Kastet – (Russia)
- GM-94 – (Russia)
