= BS-1 Tishina =

BS-1 Tishina БС-1 «Тишина»
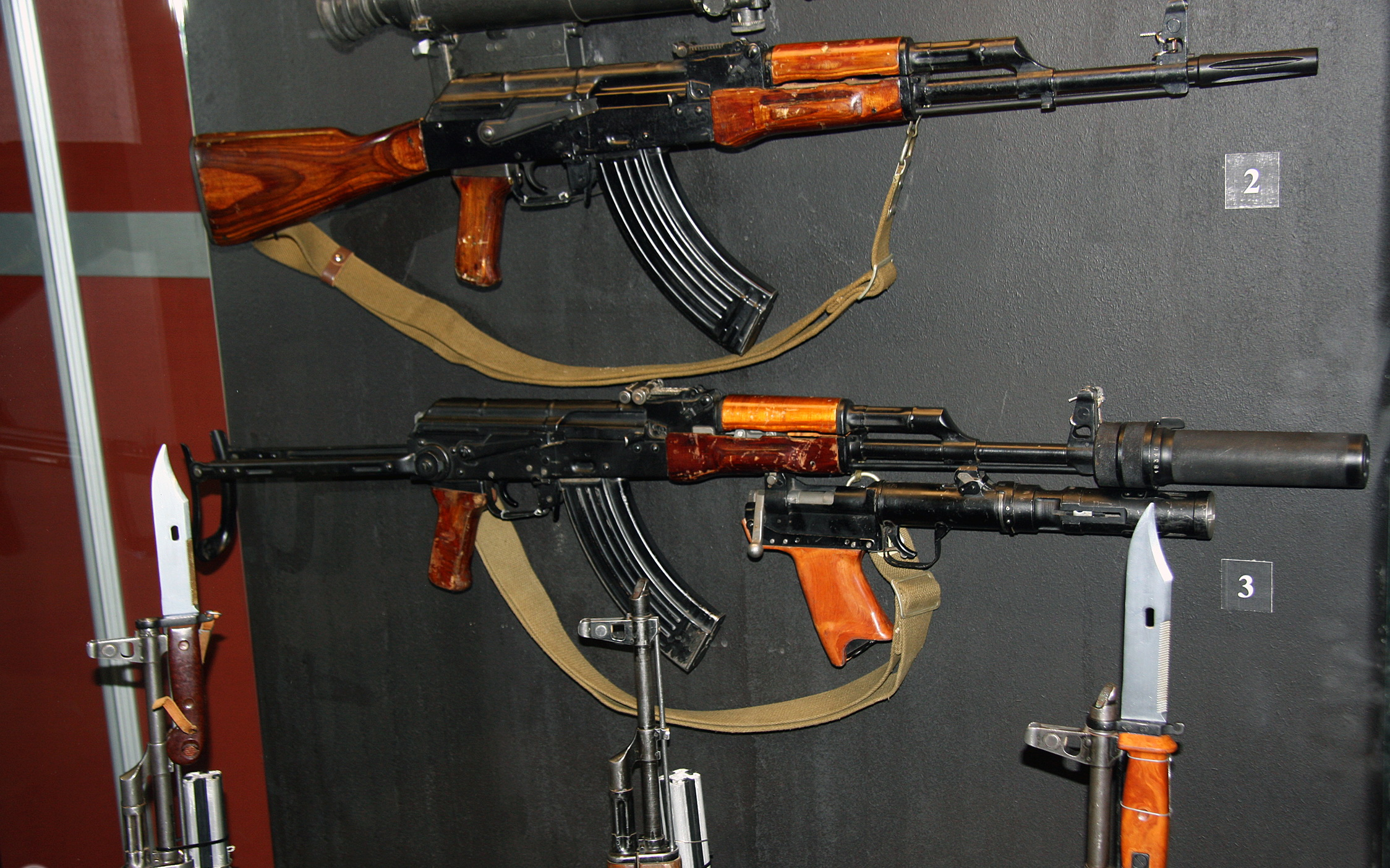
- An AKMS with PBS-1 silencer and silent BS-1 Tishina grenade launcher attached
- Type: Grenade launcher
- Place of origin: Soviet Union

Service history
- Used by: USSR

Production history
- Designer: TsNIITochMash

Specifications
- Mass: 2 kg unloaded
- Cartridge: PHS-19 7.62 Blank firing cartridge
- Caliber: 30 mm
- Action: 15 mm penetration against steel 7G23 Grenade; 10mm penetration against steel 7G20 Grenade
- Muzzle velocity: 105 m/s for 7G16 Tishina; 115 m/s for 7G17 Canary
- Effective firing range: Effective range: up to 150-200 m. Maximum range: up to 400 m.
- Sights: Iron sights

The BS-1 RGA-86 Tishina ("Silence") (БС-1 «Тишина») / BS-1M 6S1 Kanareyka ("Canary") is a silenced Soviet 30mm grenade launcher. It was developed specifically for the Spetsnaz. It uses a bolt-action mechanism to load blanks into the chamber along with the 30mm grenade VOG-T (ВОГ-Т). Pulling the trigger ignites the blank which propels the grenade from the barrel by pushing forward a piston.

== Development ==
The BS-1 "Tishina" (Silence) grenade launching system was developed for Soviet Spetsnaz (Soviet Army Special Operations forces). This system was adopted in the 1970s, to replace previously used stand-alone silenced / flash and noiseless 30mm grenade launchers known as "Device D" and "Device DM".

The idea behind a "noiseless" grenade launcher was to hide the sound and flash of the grenade launch and thus give the shooter (and his comrades) a greater chance to escape after a successful diversion behind enemy lines; the main targets for Spetsnaz during the Cold War were tactical nuclear missile launchers, C&C installations and equipment, fuel and ammunition storage facilities and parked tactical aircraft. The original BS-1 system included the 7.62×39mm Kalashnikov AKMS assault rifle with PBS-1 silencer, subsonic 7.62×39mm US ammunition, 30mm GSN-19 under barrel grenade launcher and grenade launching sight.

When, during the late 1970s, the Soviet army switched over to 5.45×39mm ammunition, 7.62mm AKMS assault rifles with PBS-1 silencer were replaced with 5.45mm AKS-74UB compact assault rifles with PBS-4 silencers. The original GSN-19 grenade launcher was slightly reworked, mainly bolt, sight and barrel group. Other changes include different mounting brackets to better suit AKS-74UB compact assault rifles and leather cover and button to hold rifle ergonomically while the launcher is dismounted. These weapons are still in limited use with Spetsnaz elements of the Russian army and probably some other armies of ex-USSR countries.

== Operation ==
The GSN-19 silent (flashless and noiseless) grenade launcher is unusual in the fact that it is both muzzle- and breech-loaded. The standard projectile is a specially designed AP-I (Armour Piercing - Incendiary) grenade with pre-engraved rifling. The warhead is designed to penetrate the hulls of tactical ballistic missile launchers, aircraft, C&C equipment, and then cause enough damage to render the target inoperative. The grenade has no propelling system in itself, as the launch is performed by special blank cartridges, which are loaded into a detachable box magazine (holding 8 cartridges in the 7.62mm based version or 10 cartridges in the 5.45mm based version). Cartridges are fed into the chamber by a manually operated rifle-type rotary bolt action mechanism. To achieve the noise- and flash-less launch, blank cartridges are discharged into the limited volume breech, which is fitted with a movable telescopic piston at the front. Upon discharge, this piston violently pushes the grenade out of the muzzle of the launcher, and then stops and seals the expanding powder gases inside the rear part of the launcher's barrel. After a short while the pressure inside drops to a safe level and the weapon can be reloaded by operating the bolt (to extract the spent blank and load a fresh launching cartridge) and then loading the new grenade from the muzzle which is then held in place by special springs. The muzzle velocity of the 30mm grenade for the 7.62mm version is quoted as "105 m/s", for the 5.45mm version it is quoted as 115 m/s. The grenade launcher is attached to special brackets, welded to the host assault rifle. To fire the GSN-19 accurately and comfortably, the host rifle is equipped with a special folding grenade launching sight (attached to the base of the standard rear sight) and with a removable, rubber, recoil-absorbing butt pad.

== Users ==
- Soviet Union/Russian Federation

== See also ==
- GP-25
- List of Russian weaponry
