= DP-65 =

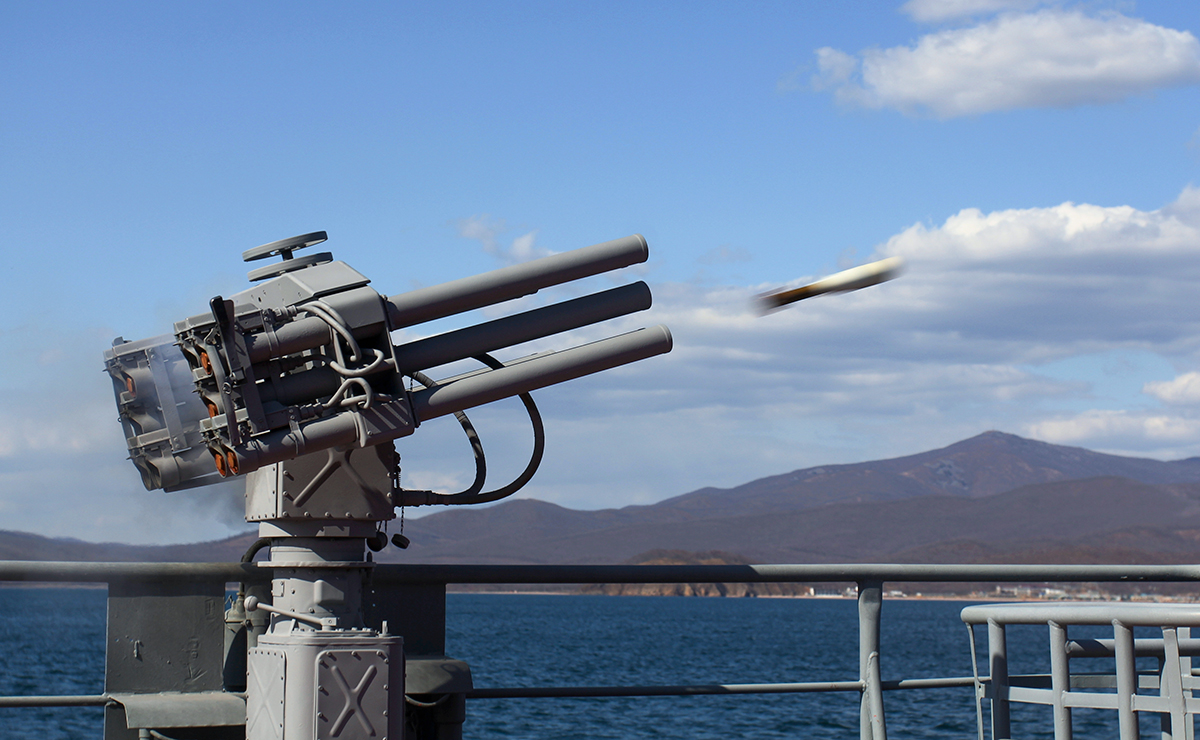
- Type: Naval grenade launcher
- Place of origin: Soviet Union

The DP-65 (98U) is a Soviet special compact 55 mm ten-barreled remotely-controlled naval grenade launcher system based on MRG-1 seven-barrel grenade launcher. It also has a manual control mode.

== Description ==
The DP-65 (98U) is a Soviet special compact 55 mm ten-barreled remotely-controlled naval grenade launcher system based on MRG-1 seven-barrel grenade launcher. It also has a manual control mode.

DP-65 uses sonar Anapa-ME for underwater target detection. DP-65 high explosive grenades RG-55M are akin to miniature depth charges equipped with rocket motor with an annular stabilizer.

In 1991, the DP-65 automated, small size, remotely-controlled Rocket Grenade Launcher system was developed and adopted by the Soviet Navy.

DP-65 can be installed directly on watercraft and on the coast.

Designed to protect ships, waterworks, offshore platforms and other important marine and coastal facilities from combat divers, frogmen, and saboteurs. The grenades are believed to produce casualties to divers within 16 meters of the explosion. They are employed by Grachonok-class anti-saboteur ships.

== Users ==
- Soviet Union
- Russian Federation
- China

== See also ==
- DP-64
- MRG-1
