= MRG-1 =

- Type: Naval grenade launcher
- Place of origin: Soviet Union

The MRG-1 Ogonyok (МРГ-1 «Огонёк») is a Soviet remotely-controlled seven-barreled naval 55 mm grenade launcher adopted by the Soviet military in 1971. Its MRG-1 grenades are akin to miniature depth charges.

It has been replaced in the Russian military by the DP-65 grenade launcher, with ten tubes.

== Users ==
- Russian Federation
- Soviet Union
- India

== See also ==
- DP-64
- DP-65
