= DP-64 =

DP-64 (ДП-64)
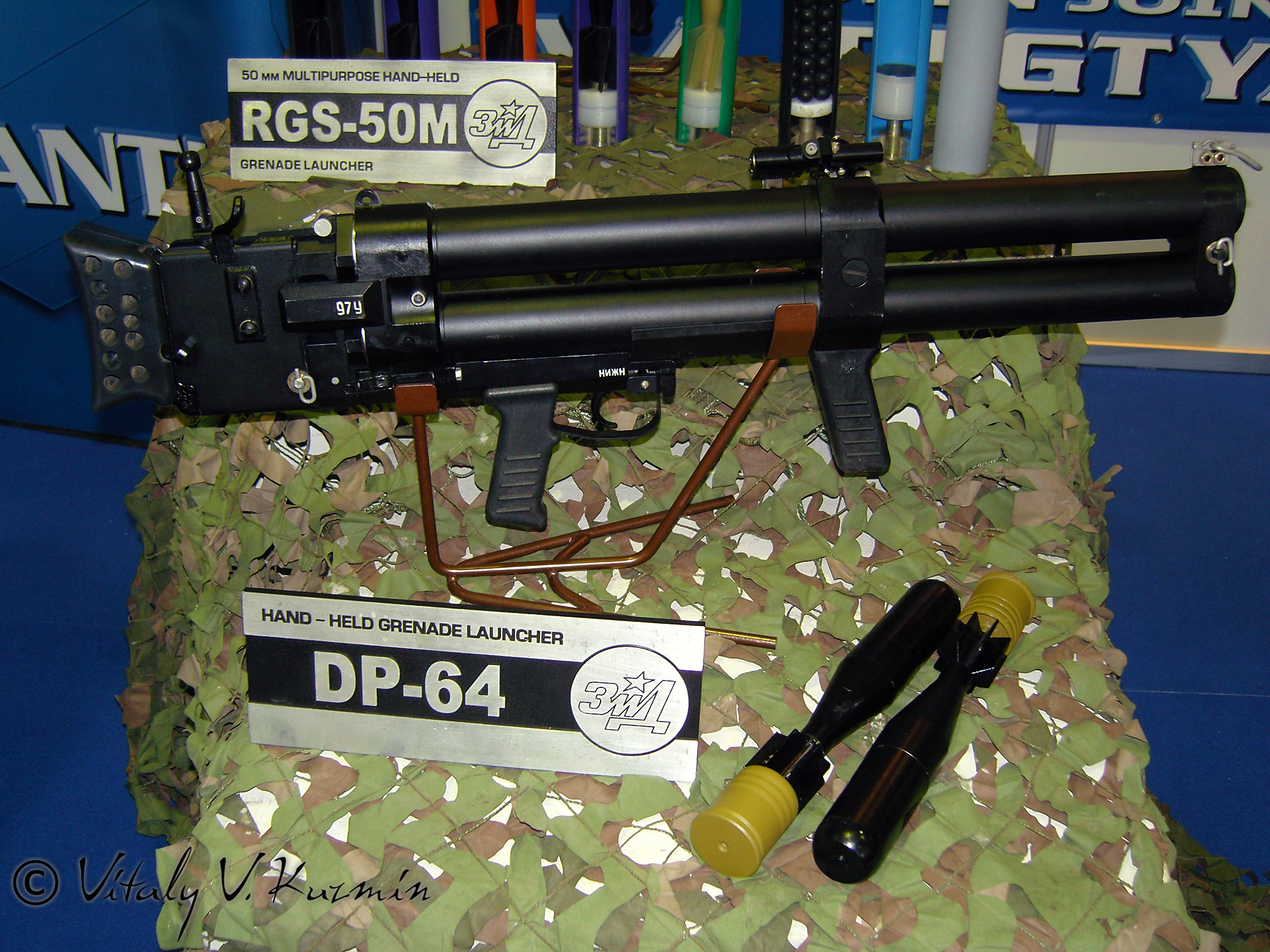
- The Russian DP-64 Anti-Saboteur weapon
- Type: Grenade launcher
- Place of origin: Soviet Union

Service history
- In service: Russia
- Used by: Russian Navy: Russian Naval Infantry
- Wars: 2022 Russian Invasion of Ukraine

Production history
- Designer: Viktor Rebrikov
- Designed: 1989
- Manufacturer: Degtyarev plant
- Produced: 1990

Specifications
- Mass: 10 kg (22 lbs)
- Length: 820 mm (32 inches)
- Width: 110 mm (4.3 inches)
- Height: 275 mm (10.8 inches)
- Caliber: 45 mm (1.771 inches)
- Action: (side) break open
- Maximum firing range: 400 meters (1,312 feet)
- Feed system: 2 rounds
- Sights: Direct & Indirect iron sights
- Detonation mechanism: Depth

The DP-64 Nepryadva is a Russian special-purpose double-barreled over/under grenade launcher designed to protect surfaced submarines, ships, dockyards, water development works, and other coastal installations from combat swimmers and naval special forces. The weapon is breech-loading and operates much like a large shotgun with a side-break breech, utilizing both direct and indirect iron sights. The weapon is capable of firing grenades indirectly at ranges up to 400 metres (1,300 ft); however, these grenades act much like small depth charges, attacking submerged swimmers like true depth charges attack submersibles. A large polymer stock and the barrels themselves makes up the bulk of the weapon. The barrels are selected by turning a lever accommodated above the trigger guard. A front pistol grip is equipped for support and is out of alignment with the rear grip and trigger mechanism, providing a more natural grip while firing indirectly. The butt is fitted with a springy rubber pad to diminish felt recoil. Direct fire sights are also provided for use from a helicopter allowing for large areas to be patrolled and protected from enemy combat swimmers. The grenade launcher was developed in 1989 and introduced in 1990.

The DP-64 grenade launcher is now in serial production, said Pavel Sidorov, a representative of NPO Bazalt, the designer of the DP-64, at the 2015 International Defense Exhibition (IDEX) in Abu Dhabi. Sidorov said that the company received a large order from Russia's Defense Ministry for the weapons. Previously, the DP-64 has only been built in small numbers for the Russian coast guard, Federal Security Service, and a handful of marine units.

Though large and somewhat unwieldy, the DP-64 serves an important role with few modern contemporaries in the small arms world.

== Ammunition ==
- Caliber: 45 millimetres (1.8 in)
- Overall length: 303 millimetres (11.9 in)
- Projectile length: 248 millimetres (9.8 in)
- Cartridge length: 55 millimetres (2.2 in)
- Shell weight: 0.65 kilograms (1.4 lb)
- Cartridge type: Rimmed, Separating base
- Operating temperature: from −50 °C (−58 °F) to +50 °C (122 °F)
- FG-45 (ФГ-45) Fragmentation [14 metres (46 ft) blast radius, to 40 metres (130 ft) depth]
- SG-45 (СГ-45) Floating Flare (red) [for ~50 seconds]
- UG-45 (УГ-45) HE/Concussion

== Users ==
- Soviet Union
- Russian Federation
- Vietnam

== See also ==
- FHJ-84 - outwardly similar looking Chinese weapon
- DP-65
- MRG-1
- GM-94
- RGM-40 Kastet
- RGSh-30
- List of grenade launchers
- List of Russian weaponry
