= Fort-600 =

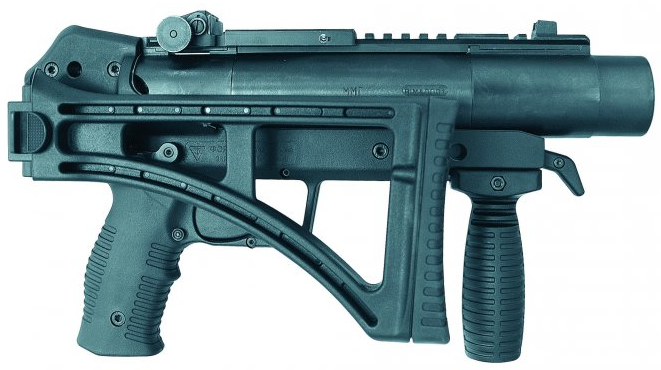
- Type: Grenade launcher
- Place of origin: Ukraine

Production history
- Designer: RPC Fort
- Manufacturer: RPC Fort
- Variants: Fort-600A

Specifications
- Mass: 2.20 kg (4.85 lb)
- Length: 580 mm (23 in) stock extended 365 mm (14.4 in) stock collapsed
- Barrel length: 280 mm (11.0 in)
- Width: 54 mm (2.1 in) stock extended 87 mm (3.4 in) stock collapsed
- Height: 196 mm (7.7 in)
- Cartridge: 40×46mm grenade
- Action: Break action
- Effective firing range: 50 to 400 m
- Feed system: Breech-loaded, single-shot

The Fort-600 is a 40 mm stand-alone grenade launcher which is modeled after the Brügger & Thomet GL-06 and is manufactured by the Ukrainian gun manufacturer RPC Fort.

== Design ==
The Fort-600 intended to defeat the live targets and fire objects at a distance from 50 to 400 m and for shooting by non-lethal ammunition.

== See also ==
- B&T GL-06 grenade launcher – (Switzerland)
