= ISS Space Sky Laser =

Light projection system

The ISS Space Sky Laser is a Class IV high-power laser light projection system primarily used at the Kennedy Space Center Visitor Complex (KSCVC). It was used to project an extreme 0.1 of divergence 532Nm (Neon Green) high power 200+ Watt laser beam at the ISS (International Space Station) for KSCVC view tracking on 26-31 December 2014.

The first Space Laser Light Projection was used for 12 hours continuously just prior to launching a Delta IV heavy rocket launch with Orion EFT-1 Mars deep space capsule into space on 5 December 2014. The ISS Space Sky Laser was filmed by many news media. They stipulated that the color green from the laser signified "Go" for launch and that the laser beam was a send-off to the Orion EFT-1 capsule to the planet Mars, even though it was an unmanned test flight. The laser is the only type of visible light high-power laser ever used at the Kennedy Space Center. It was developed by Tribal Existance Productions Worldwide (TEP Worldwide Corporation) and was certified by NASA's radiation protection officer Randall Scott CLSO and Ino Medic Health Physics Department of NASA (National Aeronautics and Space Administration). It remains on file for approved use with governmental, scientific and education uses with the operational design guidance from Tribal Existance Productions Worldwide.

In December 2017, the Laser became the subject of attention due to its supposed encounter with an alien spacecraft. This conspiracy theory, supposedly substantiated by video evidence, claimed that an unidentified spacecraft fired intermittent lasers at the ISS Space Sky Laser. The account was explained as a lens flare or reflections from the ISS itself.

The FAA (Federal Aviation Administration) reported that many civilian commercial airliners viewed this event hundreds of miles away from the Space Center.

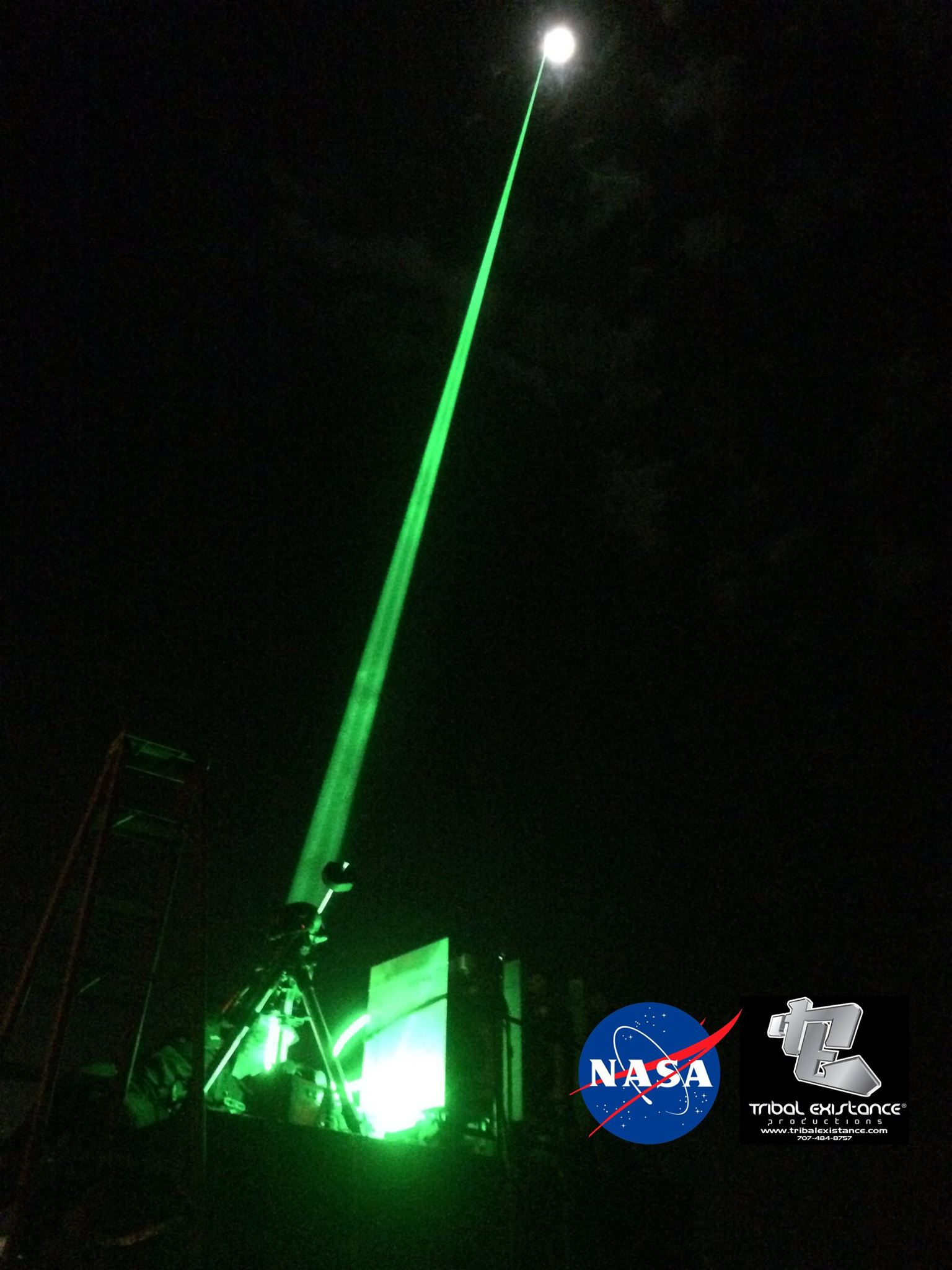
Extreme High Power ISS Space Sky Laser Light Projection System From NASA and Tribal Existance Productions Worldwide
