= Marshall G. Jones =

American mechanical engineer, inventor

Marshall G. Jones NAE, FASME, FLIA, NIHF
- Born: 1 August 1941 (age 85); Southampton, Long Island, New York, USA
- Education: University of Michigan (B.S.); University of Massachusetts Amherst (M.S., Ph.D.)
- Awards: National Academy of Engineering (NAE); National Inventors Hall of Fame (NIHF)
- Scientific career
- Fields: Laser beam welding Fiber-optic laser beam technology Laser material processing
- Workplaces: General Electric; Brookhaven National Laboratory

Marshall G. Jones (born August 1, 1941) is an American mechanical engineer, inventor, mentor, and teacher. Jones is currently a Coolidge Fellow at General Electric (GE) Global Research. He has been awarded more than 65 U.S. patents and is acknowledged as a pioneer for laser materials processing and a leading authority on fiber-optic laser beam technology. He is a fellow of the National Academy of Engineering and has been inducted into the National Inventors Hall of Fame.

== Early life ==
Marshall G. Jones was born on August 1, 1941, in the town of Southampton on New York's Long Island, US. Jones and his brother lived with his aunt and uncle on their duck farm. Jones was cared for by his extended relatives while his father was away in the Navy and his mother was in New York City to work as a seamstress. Jones excelled in mathematics and loved sports.

While at Aquebogue Elementary School, Jones developed a speech impediment that prevented him from advancing to the fifth grade for a year. Jones reflected on this in 2005 during a talk at Duke University: "I can honestly say that repeating the fourth grade is what helped me become an engineer....I just wasn't learning reading and spelling at the same pace I was learning math, and I needed to take that extra year to get caught up." Jones had an early interest in becoming a pilot, but learned as a teenager that his vision was not sharp enough. As a high school athlete, he focused on wrestling to secure a college scholarship. However, in his junior year at Riverhead High School, he injured his knee and lost a scholarship to Rochester Institute of Technology.

== Education ==
Jones graduated Riverhead High School in 1960. Based on advice from his high school counselor, Jones decided to pursue mechanical engineering at a two-year college. He joined the Mechanical Technology program at Mohawk Valley Technical Institute (now known as Mohawk Valley Community College, MVCC) in Utica, New York, and earned his Associate in Science degree in 1962. At the time, he was the only pupil of color enrolled in the mechanical technology program at the college. Racially-based discriminatory practices barred him from living in the first residence house he assigned to him in Utica. Jones then went to the University of Michigan and earned a bachelor's degree in mechanical engineering in 1965. He was the only African American student in the University of Michigan engineering school at that time. After graduation, he joined Brookhaven National Laboratory (BNL) as a development engineer and draftsperson in the High Energy Physics Department. He continued his graduate education at the University of Massachusetts Amherst. Jones earned a master's degree in mechanical engineering in 1972 and a doctorate in mechanical engineering in 1974.

== Career ==
Jones joined the General Electric Corporation Research and Development facility in Niskayuna, New York, in 1974 where he teamed up with scientists who were experimenting with lasers and semiconductors. Jones' manager at the time challenged him to fix one of their malfunctioning lasers. Building on the work of his colleagues, Jones came up with a solution that inspired his first patent: a new way to quickly weld the dissimilar metals of copper and aluminum. He also developed methods to weld other dissimilar metals like molybdenum and tungsten. He initiated research on fiber-optic laser-beam delivery systems in 1982. This created a laser beam capable of cutting nickel-based alloys, titanium, and steel. It could also weld and drill these materials at multiple angles.

Throughout Jones' career, he has been awarded more than 65 U.S. patents. Jones' Patent No. 4676586 is the patent that is on display at the National Inventors Hall of Fame. This patent describes a laser beam delivery system through a fiber optic which resulted in minimal optical losses. The system was unique in that it allowed unprecedented freedom in the manipulation of the laser beam such that hard-to-reach places were accessible. He made pivotal innovations in the method of making lead wires that is used for light bulbs. This innovation has wide-ranging impacts, including: flat emitters for x-ray tubes, diesel engine head-liner assemblies, the production of ceramic metal halide lamps, and control rods for nuclear reactors. Jones was the first to come up with a way to use lasers for materials processing in a way that made them readily adoptable for industrial applications. Not only have Jones' work and inventions transformed many industrial products, they have also been foundational to modern industrial laser welding and cutting and metal additive manufacturing.

Over his career, Jones has also been recognized many times for his professional and community service. He served as a member of the National Science Foundation (NSF) Advisory Committee. He has been a member of the board and long-time volunteer for the Capital District Chapter of the New York Association for the Learning Disabled, and a member of the external advisory board for the University of Michigan Department of Mechanical Engineering. He is a former commissioner of the Schenectady Human Rights Commission. In 2013, Jones was presented the University of Massachusetts Amherst Salute to Service award from Chancellor Subbaswamy. Jones has been recognized for his work in the African American community through the GE ICON award. Jones was also a teacher. He taught as an adjunct professor at SUNY of Albany and at Schenectady County Community College. In 1996, Jones received the Lewis H. Latimer Fund, Inc. Award for exemplary conduct as an educator.

== Community service ==
Jones has a long track record of promoting STEM education in historically underserved communities. He has mentored many K-12 grade students through programs like the GE COMPASS Program and the New York State Mentoring Program. He has regularly visited his old school district, Riverhead School District on Long Island, New York, in order to inspire the next generation of young scientists and engineers. During these visits, with a focus on fourth-graders, Jones shares his journey, his perseverance, and his expertise in lasers. In order to share his story with a broader audience, the local elementary school teachers encouraged Jones to work with a writer to produce a children's book.

== Personal life ==
Jones and his wife reside in Glenville in Schenectady County, New York, US. They have two sons.

== Awards and honors ==
- 1994: Elected Fellow of the American Society of Mechanical Engineers (ASME)
- 1994: Black Engineer of the Year Award for outstanding technical contribution in industry.
- 1999: Pioneer of the Year Golden Torch Award from the National Society of Black Engineers (NSBE)
- 2001: Coolidge Award, the GE Global Research Center's highest technical honor.
- 2001: Elected Fellow of the National Academy of Engineering (NAE) "for pioneering contributions to the application of high-power lasers in industry."
- 2007: Arthur L. Schawlow Award from the Laser Institute of America for pioneering basic and applied research in laser science and engineering
- 2017: Inducted into the National Inventors Hall of Fame (NIHF), which honors and celebrates the world's foremost inventors and their contributions to society, for his pioneering work on industrial lasers.
- 2021: Honorary Member of ASME for his “pioneering use of high-powered lasers for industrial materials processing; and for contributions to STEM education, including lifelong mentoring of young people, particularly underrepresented minorities.”
- Fellow of the Laser Institute of America
