= Laser class =

Laser class may refer to:

- Laser (dinghy), a class of sailing dinghy
- classification of lasers for laser safety
