= EN 207 =

European standard for laser eye protection

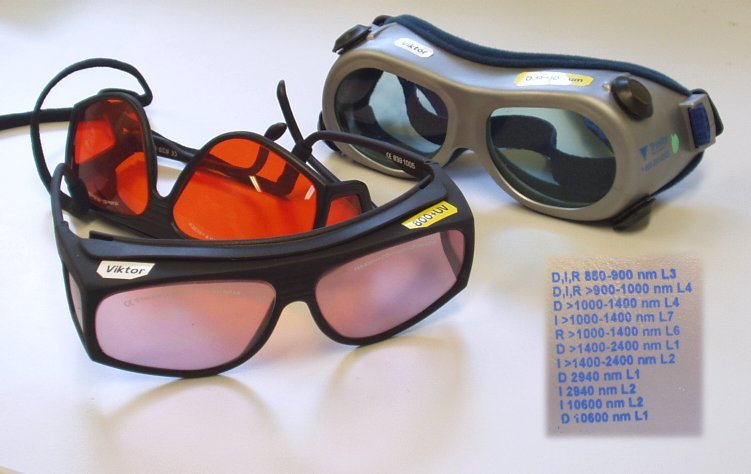
EN207-compliant laser goggles. The user has added yellow stickers summarizing the complicated EN207 specifications shown in the inset.

EN 207 is a European norm for laser safety eyewear (now superseded, together with the EN 208, by the ISO 19818:2021 standard). Any laser eye protection sold within the European Community must be certified and labeled with the CE mark. According to this standard, laser safety glasses should absorb laser light of a given wavelength, and their filters and frames should be able to withstand a direct hit from the laser without breaking or melting. In this respect, the European norm is more strict than the American norm (ANSI Z 136), which regulates only the required optical density. More precisely, the safety glasses should be able to withstand a continuous wave laser for 5 seconds, or 50 pulses for a pulsed laser (EN 207:2017).

An EN 207 specification might read IR 315–532 LB6. Here, the letters IR indicate the laser working mode, in this case a pulsed mode. The range 315–532 indicates the wavelength range in nanometers. Finally, the scale number LB6 indicates a lower limit for the optical density, i.e. the transmittance within this wavelength range is less than 10^{−6}.

== Laser working modes ==
EN 207 specifies four laser working modes:

Working mode	Letter	Pulse length
Continuous wave	D	> 0.25 s
Pulsed mode	I	> 1 μs–0.25 s
Giant pulsed mode	R	> 1 ns–1 μs
Modelocked	M	< 1 ns

== Scale numbers ==
The scale numbers range from LB1 to LB10, where the number is a lower limit for the optical density, i.e. LBn means that OD > n, or $T < 10^{-n}$, where T is the transmittance. The minimum scale number for a given laser with a beam diameter of 1 mm depends on the working mode and the wavelength as follows (EN 207:2017):

Working mode	Wavelength range	Maximum laser power density	Minimum protection level for given power*
D (continuous)	180–315 nm	1×10^{n−3} W/m^{2}	log(P) + 3
	>315–1400 nm	1×10^{n+1} W/m^{2}	log(P) − 1
	>1400 nm–1000 μm	1×10^{n+3} W/m^{2}	log(P) − 3
I,R (pulsed)	180–315 nm	3×10^{n+1} J/m^{2}	log(E/3) − 1
	>315–1400 nm	5×10^{n−3} J/m^{2}	log(E/5) + 3
	>1400 nm–1000 μm	1×10^{n+2} J/m^{2}	log(E) − 2
M (ultrashort pulses)	180–315 nm	3×10^{n+10} W/m^{2}	log(P/3) − 10
	>315–1400 nm	1.5×10^{n−4} J/m^{2}	log(E/1.5) + 4
	>1400 nm–1000 μm	1×10^{n+11} W/m^{2}	log(P) − 11
*P in W/m^{2}, E in J/m^{2}. Level numbers should be rounded upwards.

If the beam diameter differs from 1 mm a correction factor, depending on the material of the filter and frame, must be applied. Another correction factor must be used for pulsed lasers in case of repeated pulses for wavelengths above 400 nm.

Examples

1. the laser operates at 1064 nm and has a pulse duration of 10 ns, 100 mJ/cm^{2} (or 10^{3} J/m^{2}). You have goggles that are specified as DIR 1064 LB5. The pulse duration indicates that we should look at the R specification, with scale number n=5, which gives an upper limit of 5×10^{2} J/m^{2}, which means that these goggles do not offer suitable protection for this particular laser.
2. the laser operates at 780 nm, is continuous wave with an intensity of 50 mW/cm^{2} (P = 500 W/m^{2}). This means you need a D protection level of $log(500)-1=1.69$, which is rounded up to 2. In other words, the safety goggles should be at least D 780 LB2.
3. such example can be found too 900 - 1070 D LB7 + IR LB8 + M LB8Y.
  The symbols have the same meaning as in the previous examples, just note on marking with Y: if the eye protection device has not been tested with low repetition frequencies (≤ 25 Hz), the protection level must be extended by the letter Y .

From the scale it can be inferred that the power densities that correspond to $n=0$ are considered safe without protective eyewear.
