= Audience scanning =

Type of stage lighting

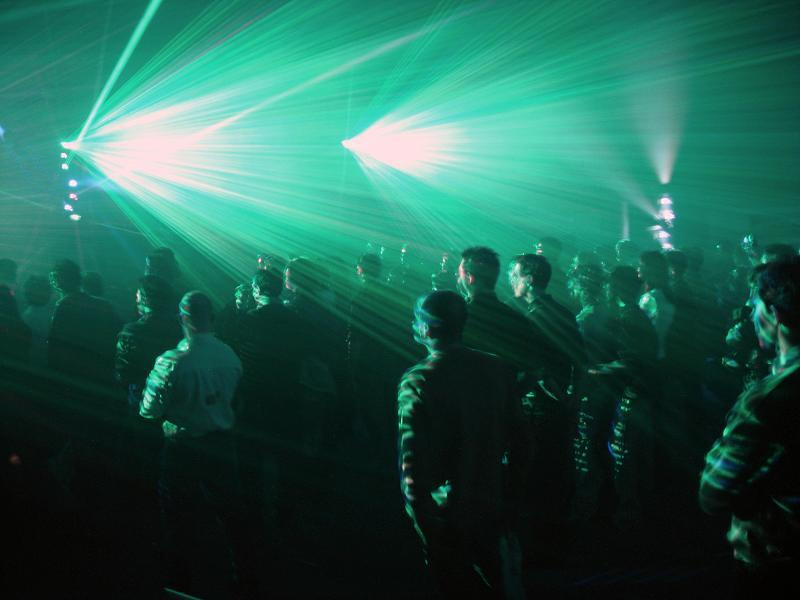
An audience watches a laser light show during the SIB trade fair in Rimini, Italy in 2002.

Audience scanning (sometimes called crowd scanning) is when a laser lighting display is directed towards its audience. Although this is preferred for many laser effects such as tunnels, it is potentially dangerous due to the high levels of laser radiation exposed to the eyes of audience members.

Laser effects involving audience scanning are created by scanning the beam very rapidly across the audience, ensuring that the net exposure to any one eye is very small. Should the scanning mechanism fail, however, it is possible to expose people to laser light at levels that may produce eye injury.

== Legality and regulation ==
National legislation concerning the legality of audience scanning varies greatly from country to country. The biggest point of contention is the method of calculating the level of exposure actually received. The MPE (maximum permissible exposure) is essentially the same throughout the world, but some countries are far more conservative in their estimations of the amount of light received by the eye. Audience scanning is not widely practiced in the United States; it is far more accepted in the United Kingdom, despite having been stopped for a period, and in the rest of Europe.

== Laser injury reports ==
The lasers used for many laser displays have energy levels that can exceed the MPE within a few tens of microseconds. Measurement and calculation techniques both show that the beam durations that audience members are routinely subjected would indicate that the MPE is being exceeded, often by a significant factor. Yet reported injuries from medical reports, and even anecdotal reports are rare.

For example, a 1996 study commissioned by a lasershow related company tried to find worldwide reports of audience scanning injuries at any time during the then-20 years of laser light shows. As reported in a 1997 paper presented at the International Laser Safety Conference, the study found only five accidents (claimed injuries) and two incidents (potential injury). Accounting for an estimated 90% under-reporting factor, the ILSC paper estimated that there were roughly 70 injuries per decade — a relatively small number considering the total number of concert-goers and disco patrons exposed to laser light, some night after night.

== Audience scanning calculations ==
In making safety calculations for audience scanning, there are two steps. The first is to determine the static laser beam parameters, such as laser power, divergence, audience distance etc. The result will give the irradiance, MPE, nominal ocular hazard distance (NOHD), and other safety-related characteristics for a fixed beam at the closest point of audience access. This is the "worst case".

The second step is to calculate the effect of scanning this fixed beam. As the beam passes one or more times over the eye, it creates one or more pulses. Thus, single- and multiple-pulse MPEs come into play. For simple, repeated scan patterns, it is possible to calculate the maximum possible exposure, by looking at the location (such as an edge) where the beam is moving slowest (longest dwell time).

But for a laser show, where there are many different scan patterns, it is nearly impossible to calculate the "worst case" location for viewing the show. This is where making multiple measurements of the show can help.

Doing measurements requires caution in using the proper type of instruments, and in correctly setting up and interpreting the measurements. There is no single right answer, since a detector could "pass" the show in one location but "fail" it in another. Taking measurements at a number of different locations—say 10 or 20—can give a general indication as to the show's intensity.

There are a few commercial systems available which help with audience scanning calculations and measurements. One software program is available in a free "Lite" version which can be used to determine basic beam parameters, and worst-case static beam and single pulse calculations.

== ILDA audience scanning guidelines ==
In November 1998, a panel of safety experts and laser operators, convened by the International Laser Display Association, issued a joint statement regarding audience scanning. It included guidelines and a cautionary statement.

"No system or test can absolutely guarantee eye safety when deliberately scanning the audience. You should use accepted instruments and practices to check the questionable parts of your show. The following tips are general ways to make your show safer through good design practices, and if accepted instruments are not available at your show site."
