= Lasers and aviation safety =

A police helicopter in Florida being illuminated by a child's laser pointer, demonstrating the beam's disorienting effects on the aircrew.

Under certain conditions, laser light or other bright lights (spotlights, searchlights) directed at aircraft can be a hazard. The most likely scenario is when a bright visible laser light causes distraction or temporary flash blindness to a pilot, during a critical phase of flight such as landing or takeoff. It is far less likely, though still possible, that a visible or invisible beam could cause permanent harm to a pilot's eyes. Although laser weapons are under development by armed forces, these are so specialized, expensive and controlled that it is improbable for non-military lasers to cause structural damage to an aircraft.

Pointing a laser at an aircraft can be hazardous to pilots, and has resulted in arrests, trials and jail sentences. It also results in calls to license or ban laser pointers. Some jurisdictions such as New South Wales, Australia have restricted laser pointers as a result of multiple incidents.

In addition to lasers, other bright directional lights such as searchlights and spotlights can have the same dazzling, distracting, and flashblinding effects.

== Lasers in airspace ==
Lasers are used in industry and research, such as in atmospheric remote sensing, and as guide stars in adaptive optics astronomy. Lasers and searchlights are used in entertainment; for example, in outdoor shows such as the nightly IllumiNations show at Walt Disney World's Epcot. Laser pointers are used by the general public; sometimes they will be accidentally or deliberately aimed at or near aircraft.

Lasers are even used, or proposed for use, with aircraft. Pilots straying into unauthorized airspace over Washington, D.C. can be warned to turn back by shining eye-safe low-power red and green lasers at them. At least one system has been tested that would use lasers on final approach to help line up the pilot on the proper glideslope. NASA has tested a Helicopter Airborne Laser Positioning System. The Federal Aviation Administration (FAA) has tested laser-projected lines on airport runways, to increase visibility of "hold short" markings. Because of these varied uses, it is not practical to ban lasers from airspace.

== Primary hazards of lasers and bright lights ==
FAA flight simulator showing distraction where the light does not obscure vision but can distract the pilot. Light intensity 0.5 μW/cm^{2}; for example, a legal 5 mW laser pointer at 3,700 feet (1,100 m).

FAA flight simulator showing veiling glare where it is hard to see through the light to the background scene. Light level 5.0 μW/cm^{2}; for example, a legal 5 mW laser pointer at 1,200 feet (370 m).

Simulation of temporary flash blindness where the image takes from a few seconds to a few minutes to fade away, depending on how much light entered the eye. Light level 50 μW/cm^{2}; for example, a legal 5 mW laser pointer at 350 feet (110 m).

The photos at right flash because most incidents are of flashes and not of steady illumination. In accidental illuminations there may be just one or a few flashes. Even in deliberate illuminations, it is difficult to keep a hand-held laser focused on a moving target, so there will be a series of longer flashes. With helicopters at close range, it is possible to have a more or less continuous light. The flashes shown greatly exaggerate the duration of a laser flash and use green rather than less visible red light. With a plane traveling hundreds of miles per hour and a laser beam size of only a meter or so, flash durations would be measured in thousandths of a second.

There are some subjects which aviation safety experts agree pose no real hazard. These include passenger exposure to laser light, pilot distraction during cruising or other non-critical phases of flight, and laser damage to the aircraft. The main concerns of safety experts are focused on laser and bright light effects on pilots, especially when they are in a critical phase of flight: takeoff, approach, landing, and emergency maneuvers.

There are four primary areas of concern. The first three are visual effects that temporarily distract or block pilots' vision. These effects are only of concern when the laser emits visible light.

- Distraction and startle: an unexpected laser or bright light could distract the pilot during a nighttime landing or takeoff. A pilot might not know what was happening at first. They may be worried that a brighter light or other threat would be coming.
- Glare and disruption: as the light brightness increases, it starts to interfere with vision. Veiling glare would make it difficult to see out the windscreen. Night vision starts to deteriorate. Laser light is highly directional, so pilots may act to exclude the source from their direct field of vision. Pointer lasers have an illuminance of about 1 lux, whereas during the day the pilots have to deal with sunlight which is one hundred thousand times stronger.
- Temporary flash blindness works exactly like a bright camera flash: there is no injury, but night vision is temporarily disrupted. There may be afterimages, like a bright camera flash leaving temporary spots.

The three visual effects above are the primary concern for aviation experts. This is because they could happen with lower-powered lasers that are commonly available. The fourth concern, eye damage, is much less likely: it would require specialized equipment not readily available to the general public.

- Eye damage. Though it is unlikely, high power visible or invisible (infrared, ultraviolet) laser light could cause permanent eye injury. The injury could be relatively minor, such as spots only detectable by medical exam or on the periphery of vision. At higher power levels, the spots may be in the central vision, in the same area where the original light was viewed. Most unlikely of all is injury causing a complete and permanent loss of vision. To do this would require very specialized equipment and a desire to deliberately target aircraft.

It is extremely unlikely that any of the four elements above would cause loss of the aircraft.

== Analyzing the hazard ==
The exact hazard in a specific situation depends on a number of factors.

=== Bright light factors ===
- Power: the more light emitted, the brighter and more hazardous it will be.
- Beam divergence: a low-divergence "tight" beam will be a hazard at greater distances than one which spreads out rapidly.
- Wavelength of the beam: an infrared or ultraviolet laser beam does not present any visual effect risk to pilots, as they cannot see it. However, at high powers it can present an eye damage risk. In some cases, this hazard may be greater since a pilot would not know they were being illuminated. In general, the eyes of pilots in an illuminated nighttime cockpit are most sensitive to greenish-yellow light (of wavelength around 500–600 nanometers, peaking at 555 nm). A blue or red laser will appear much dimmer—and thus less distracting—than a green or yellow laser of equal power. For example, a 10-watt continuous-wave yttrium aluminium garnet laser at 532 nanometers (green) can appear brighter to the eye than an 18-watt continuous-wave argon-ion laser that outputs 10 watts of 514 nm (green-blue) light plus 8 watts of 488 nm (blue) light.
- Pulsing: some laser beams emit their energy in pulses. A pulsed laser presents a greater eye damage risk than a continuous laser of equal average power. This is because the power is packed into shorter but more intense pulses.

=== Operational factors ===
- Beam movement: if the beam is moving around such as in a laser show, it covers a greater area of the sky and thus has a greater chance to illuminate an aircraft. However, if it did scan across a cockpit, in general the exposure duration would be shorter.
- Location of the beam relative to airports: the FAA has established safety zones around airports, which are described in the "Regulation" section below. It is possible to use beams within the zones, if the beam power is below the FAA limit for the zone.
- Projector and laser stability: if a projector slips, or safety software fails, the beam could enter unsafe areas of airspace.

=== Situational factors ===
- Day vs. night: almost all concern is over nighttime illumination. The three visual effects listed above (distraction, glare and flash blindness) are minimized during the day since the eye is not dark adapted, and since visible lasers are not often used outdoors in daytime.
- Motion and speed of the aircraft. A slow aircraft is at greater risk than a fast one (relative to travel across the viewer's line of sight). Helicopters are at greatest risk because they can hover, presenting a relatively stationary target.
- Distance to the aircraft. A low-flying aircraft is at greater risk. Again, helicopters are vulnerable due to their close ground proximity.
- Direction relative to the aircraft and cockpit. A beam aimed directly at an incoming aircraft gives the greatest risk to pilots. One aimed across the aircraft's travel gives less risk, partially because the light enters through the side windows, and partially because it is harder to keep the beam aimed exactly at the cockpit area. A beam aimed straight up gives the least risk, although it is still possible for the beam to illuminate the cockpit during a banking turn.

=== Pilot and aircrew factors ===
- Flight phase. The risk is greatest when the exposure comes during a time of high workload: takeoffs, critical or emergency maneuvers, and landings.
- Pilot awareness and response: a pilot can make the situation worse if they overreact, stare at the light to try to locate its source, or carry out unnecessary evasive maneuvers.

The US FAA has studied some of these factors. They conducted research using pilots in flight simulators to determine the effects of laser exposure on pilot performance; results were released in August 2003 and June 2004.

=== Prevalence ===
Reported laser strikes in the United States rose from 5,663 in 2018 to 10,993 in 2025, peaking at 13,304 in 2023.

== Reducing the hazard ==
There are a number of ways that laser users, regulators and pilots reduce the potential hazard from outdoor laser use. These measures include:

=== Police enforcement ===
Police have begun using helicopters to patrol and seek out people using lasers to disrupt aviation.

=== User hazard reduction measures ===
- Using the lowest power necessary for the task.
- Increasing the beam divergence. The beam spreads out faster, so at any given distance, the amount of light entering the eye or a cockpit windscreen will be less (e.g., lower irradiance).
- Keeping beams away from areas with many aircraft, such as airports and flight paths.
- Terminating beams on buildings, dense trees, etc. to prevent laser light from entering protected airspace. This is a common protection measure for outdoor laser shows, if there are structures available for termination.
- Using spotters to watch for aircraft. This is commonly done for laser shows which tend to be short-duration (around an hour) and infrequent (nightly shows are rare).
- Using automated detection systems such as radar or sky cameras. These are used for long-duration (all night) and frequent (nightly) applications, such as laser guide stars used at astronomical observatories.
- Developing and following policies for outdoor laser operations, such as the ANSI standard "Safe Use of Lasers Outdoors" or NASA's "Use Policy for Outdoor Lasers".

=== Regulatory hazard reduction measures ===
- Restricting the sale or use of laser devices. This is done in some jurisdictions. For example, in April 2008 New South Wales, Australia banned laser pointer possession, except by special permit, in an effort to reduce the number of laser illuminations of aircraft. In October 1997 in the United Kingdom, administrative steps were taken to restrict the sale of laser pointers > 1 milliwatt output, for similar reasons (although the purchase, importation and use of such pointers in the UK remains lawful). In the US, the Congressional Research Service notes that a ban could "pose significant challenges because these devices are widely available at low cost and are used in a variety of applications such as laser pointers, laser levels and laser gun sights."
- Requiring review or approval of outdoor laser uses. This is discussed in the Regulation and control section below.
- Amending existing laws, or enacting new ones, to try to discourage irresponsible laser use. One US federal effort in this direction is the "Securing Airplane Cockpits Against Lasers Act of 2005", discussed in the History section below.
- Following a series of accidents caused by lasers, Arizona state passed Bill 2164 (2014) that making it a Class One misdemeanor to point a laser at an aircraft.

=== Pilot/aircrew hazard reduction measures ===
- Fixed laser installations (e.g. laser guide stars from observatories) may be marked on aeronautical charts so pilots are aware of potential beams along their flight path. Temporary uses (laser shows) may be described in pre-flight information. For example, in the US, laser uses submitted to the FAA are often listed in NOTAMs for pilots.
- Education and training. The SAE G-10T Laser Hazards Subcommittee is working on Aerospace Recommended Practice document 5598, "Laser Visual Interference - Pilot Operational Procedures." This will provide information for pilots on recognizing and recovering from a laser or bright light incident. Articles in aviation publications also have provided helpful information, such as "Laser Illuminations: The Last Line of Defense - The Pilot!".

=== Active hazard reduction (proposed measures) ===
Some measures have been proposed to protect aircrews including goggles and windscreen filters. These may work in theory (especially against known wavelengths) and may be useful in some situations such as military operations. However, these measures may not be suitable, practical or recommended for widespread civil air operations.

- Laser safety goggles: laboratory-type laser safety goggles are not well suited for pilot operation, due to their low transmission and optical quality. Also, there may be a variety of laser wavelengths that may need to be defended against. If all wavelengths are protected, the goggles are essentially opaque. There are also issues with the discomfort of wearing goggles routinely, given that laser incidents are relatively rare.
- Active "smart" goggles which can detect laser light and then activate a blocking or dimming process based on the power and wavelength. It is not known if these are in production or use; if so, it is likely that these are used only in military applications.
- Glare shields that can be pulled down over a windscreen to reduce all incoming light.
- Laser event detectors and recorders that can sense a laser illumination and record information about the wavelength and power. This does not provide protection but does give information about an illumination which may be useful for later analysis or legal action.

== Regulation and control ==
The US FAA Laser Free Zone extends horizontally 2 nmi (3,700 m) from the centerline of all runways (two dark lines in this diagram) with additional 3 nmi (5,600 m) extensions at each end of a runway. Vertically, the LFZ extends to 2,000 feet (610 m) above ground level.

The US FAA Critical Flight Zone extends horizontally 10 nmi (19 km) around the airport, and extends vertically to 10,000 feet (3,000 m) above ground level. The optional Sensitive Flight Zone is designated around special airspace needing bright-light protection.

In the United States, laser airspace guidelines can be found in Federal Aviation Administration Order JO 7400.2, Chapter 29 "Outdoor Laser Operations", and bright light airspace guidelines are in Chapter 30 "High Intensity Light Operations".

In the United Kingdom, CAP 736 is the "Guide for the Operation of Lasers, Searchlights and Fireworks in United Kingdom Airspace."

For all laser users, the ANSI Z136.6 document gives guidance for the safe use of outdoor lasers. While this document is copyrighted by ANSI and is relatively costly, a flavor of its recommendations can be seen in NASA's Use Policy for Outdoor Lasers.

=== Airspace zones ===
The US FAA has established airspace zones. These protect the area around airports and other sensitive airspace from the hazards of safe-but-too-bright visible laser light exposure:

- The Laser Free Zone extends immediately around and above runways, as depicted at right. Light irradiance within the zone must be less than 50 nanowatts per square centimeter (0.05 microwatts per square centimeter). This was set at "a level that would not cause any visual disruption."
- The Critical Flight Zone covers 10 nautical miles (12 mi; 19 km) around the airport; the light limit is 5 microwatts per square centimeter (μW/cm^{2}), determined to be the level at which glare becomes significant.
- The optional Sensitive Flight Zone is designated by the FAA, military or other aviation authorities where light intensity must be less than 100 μW/cm^{2}. This might be done for example around a busy flight path or where military operations are taking place. This was identified as the limiting level beyond which flash blindness and afterimages could occur.
- The Normal Flight Zone covers all other airspace. The light intensity must be less than 2.5 milliwatts per square centimeter (2500 μW/cm^{2}). This is about half of the Class 3R power level.

For non-visible lasers (infrared and ultraviolet), the irradiance at the aircraft must be eye-safe—below the Maximum Permissible Exposure level for that wavelength. For pulsed visible lasers, the irradiance at the aircraft must be both eye-safe and must be at or below any applicable FAA laser zone.

In the UK, restrictions are in place in a zone that includes a circle 3 nmi (5.6 km) in radius around an airport, plus extensions from each end of each runway. The runway zones are rectangles 20 nmi (37 km) in total length and 1,000 meters (3,300 feet) wide, centered about each runway.

=== Regulatory and standards development ===
A key group inside the US working on laser and aviation safety is the Society of Automotive Engineers (SAE) G-10T, Laser Safety Hazards Subcommittee. It consists of laser safety experts and researchers, pilots and other interested parties representing military, commercial and private aviation, and laser users. Their recommendations have formed the basis of the FAA laser and bright light regulations and forms, as well as standards adopted in other countries and by the ICAO.

The ANSI Z136.6 standard is the "American National Standard for Safe Use of Lasers Outdoors." The Z136.6 committee has worked closely with SAE G-10T and others, to develop recommended safety procedures for outdoor laser use.

== History ==
Until the early 1990s, laser and bright light aviation incidents were sporadic. In the US, NASA's Aviation Safety Reporting System showed only one or two incidents per year. The SAE G-10T subcommittee began meeting around 1993 as the number of incidents grew. Almost all of the incidents were known or suspected to be due to outdoor laser displays. Almost all of the concern was over potential eye damage; at the time visual effects were felt to be a minor consequence.

In late 1995, a number of illumination incidents occurred in Las Vegas due to new outdoor laser displays. Although the displays had been approved by the FDA as eye-safe for their airport proximity, no one had realized that the glare and distraction hazard would adversely affect pilots. In December 1995 the FDA issued an emergency order shutting down the Las Vegas shows.

Within the SAE G-10T subcommittee, there was some consideration about cutting back or banning laser shows. However, it became apparent that there were a large number of non-entertainment laser users as well. The focus shifted to control of known laser users, whether shows or industry/research. New policies and procedures were developed, such as the FAA 7400.2 Chapter 29, and Advisory Circular 70-1. Although incidents continued to occur (from January 1996 to July 1999, the FAA's Western-Pacific Region identified more than 150 incidents in which low-flying aircraft were illuminated by lasers), the situation seemed under control.

Then in late 2004 and early 2005 came a significant increase in reported incidents linked to laser pointers. The wave of incidents may have been triggered in part by "copycats" who read press accounts of laser pointer incidents. In one case, a New Jersey resident was charged under federal Patriot Act anti-terrorism laws, after he allegedly shone a laser pointer at aircraft.

Responding to the incidents, the Congressional Research Service issued a study on the laser "threat to aviation safety and security." Because there was no federal law specifically banning deliberate laser illumination of aircraft, Congressman Ric Keller introduced HR 1400, the "Securing Airplane Cockpits Against Lasers Act of 2005." The bill was passed by the US House and Senate, but did not go to conference and thus did not become law. In 2007, Keller re-introduced the bill as HR 1615. Although passed by the House in May 2007, it was not acted on by the Senate before the end of the 110th Congress and never became law.

On March 28, 2008, a coordinated attack took place using four green laser pointers aimed at six aircraft landing at Sydney airport in New South Wales, Australia. As a result of this attack plus others, a law was proposed in mid-April 2008 in New South Wales to ban possession of handheld lasers, including low-power classroom pointers. The Australian state of Victoria has had a similar ban since 1998, but press reports state that it is easy to buy lasers without a permit.

On February 22, 2009, a dozen planes were targeted with green laser beams at Seattle-Tacoma International Airport. An FAA spokeswoman said there were 148 laser attacks on aircraft in the US from January 1, 2009 to February 23, 2009.

During the July 2013 protests against the presidency of Mohamed Morsi in Egypt and later celebration of his removal, thousands of protesters and revelers aimed laser pointers at government helicopters.

In February 2016 a Virgin Atlantic flight from Heathrow to New York JFK Airport was forced to turn back when a laser beam was shone into the cockpit. The incident led the British Airline Pilots' Association to call for lasers to be classified as offensive weapons.

In the first seven months of 2018, United States Armed Forces pilots were targeted with laser points in multiple regions, but particularly in the Middle East.

In December 2021, a Mississippi man faced federal charges, including 5 years in prison, and $25,000 in fines, for months of targeting aircraft flying into Memphis International Airport.

== See also ==
- Dazzler (weapon)
- Laser safety
- Laser pointer
