= Laser Institute of America =

International professional society for laser education and information

Laser Institute of America, Inc.
- LIA Logo
- Abbreviation: LIA
- Formation: February 7, 1968; 58 years ago
- Founded at: California
- Legal status: 501(c)(3) Not-for-profit Organization
- Headquarters: Orlando, FL
- Location: United States
- Region served: Worldwide
- Executive Director: Shaun Oleson
- Chief Financial Officer: Kristen Arnold
- Subsidiaries: Board of Laser Safety, Inc.
- Staff: 14 FTEs
- Website: www.lia.org
- Formerly called: Laser Industry Association

LIA - The Laser Institute (formerly Laser Industry Association, later Laser Institute of America, commonly referred to as LIA) is an international professional society with a focus on laser applications and laser safety. LIA was founded on February 7, 1968, as the Laser Industry Association, and acts as secretariat to the Accredited Standards Committee (ASC) Z136, which develops and maintains the Z136 series of laser safety standards. LIA is publisher of these American National Standards Institute (ANSI) Z136 laser safety standards, which provide the foundation of laser safety programs nationally.

LIA is also the publisher of the Journal of Laser Applications and is the organizer of several large international conferences related to laser use and laser safety.

The Board of Laser Safety, a part of LIA, develops and administers the professional certification of Certified Laser Safety Officers (CLSO) and Certified Medical Laser Safety Officers (CMLSO).

== History ==
In 1967, the 90th US Congress Subcommittee on Public Health and Welfare of the Committee on Interstate and Foreign Commerce held multiple hearings (August 14, September 28, and October 5, 11 and 17) on electronic product radiation control. Those hearings led to the passage of the Radiation Control for Health and Safety Act in 1968. Shortly after the passage of this bill, the US Army created a special joint medical research team at Frankford Arsenal (Philadelphia) known as the Joint Laser Safety Team to study laser biological effects. By the end of 1968, the American Conference of Governmental Industrial Hygienists (ACGIH) had issued guidance on exposure limits and the State of Illinois had produced the first state regulation on laser systems. With these developments, the industry was concerned of needless government regulations. and as a result, the Laser Industry Association (LIA) was formed.

LIA was founded on February 7, 1968; 58 years ago as the Laser Industry Association by industry pioneers including Theodore Maiman and Arthur Leonard Schawlow. LIA's founders developed the LIA with many objectives, including:

- Assist the establishment of laser health and safety standards.
- Activate and direct procedures to establish adequate legislation and formulate legislative relations at the national, international, State and local levels.
- Educate and formulate a proper image of the laser industry by means of public relations, especially in the areas of laser applications and safety.
- Act as a focal point for inquiries related to the laser industry and a means of communication between various disciplines, including the organizations engaged in laser technologies, organizations which are interested in learning of laser technology, and government agencies.
- Act as an agency to establish laser standards, definitions, methods of measurements, and the like.

The LIA would rename to Laser Institute of America in 1972 with the following objectives:

- To disseminate laser-related information and data in publications and symposia.
- To promote, conduct and sponsor/co-sponsor events related to laser subjects.
- To develop and present short courses, programs and curricula for training.
- To act as a focal point for collecting and disseminating data, inquiries and statistics regarding the laser community with regards to applications, safety, research and development.
- To act as a liaison with other organizations in the advancement of laser technology.
- To assist federal and state government agencies to enact legislation relating to the safety of laser products.

== Former Names ==
The organization was founded as Laser Industry Association in 1968. In 1972, the organization was renamed Laser Institute of America.

== Awards ==
The institute issues the following awards:

- Arthur L. Schawlow Award

 OBJECTIVE: To recognize outstanding, career-long contributions to basic and applied research in laser science and engineering leading to fundamental understanding of laser materials interaction and/or transfer of laser technology for increased application in industry, medicine and daily life.

- George M. Wilkening Award

 OBJECTIVE: To recognize outstanding contributions to laser bioeffects research and biophysics related to the establishment of human exposure limits, in safety standards development and education, and in applied laser safety and/or the development of engineering control techniques to increase the wider applications of laser technology in industry, medicine and daily life.

- R. James Rockwell, Jr. Educational Achievement Award

 OBJECTIVE: To recognize outstanding contributions in laser safety education.

- LIA Leadership Award

 OBJECTIVE: To recognize outstanding leadership in an organization or a company that has significantly benefited the world laser community or has led to major global impacts in the advancement of laser science, technology, engineering or applications.

- LIA Fellow Award

 OBJECTIVE: To recognize members of the institute who have: attained unusual professional distinction in the LIA mission areas of laser science and technology, laser applications and/or laser safety; and provided outstanding service to their field.

- Achievement in Laser Safety Education (ALSE) Award

 OBJECTIVE: To recognize organizations and their laser safety program managers, for devoting significant time and resources in the education of personnel in the area of laser safety.

- David H. Sliney Award

 OBJECTIVE: To recognize organizations for laser safety excellence and will be presented at ILSC 2019. Only ALSE award recipients are eligible for this distinguished honor.

== Publications ==
=== Scientific Journal ===
The Journal of Laser Applications (JLA) is the scientific platform of the institute. The journal publishes peer-reviewed manuscripts quarterly. Scientific categories included in the JLA include:

- Quantum Materials Engineering
- Additive Nanomanufacturing
- High Precision Materials Processing with Ultrafast Lasers
- Laser Additive Manufacturing
- High Power Materials Processing with High Brightness Lasers
- Emerging Applications of Laser Technologies in High-performance/Multi-function Materials and Structures
- Surface modification
- Lasers in Nanomanufacturing / Nanophotonics & Thin Film Technology
- Spectroscopy / Imaging / Diagnostics / Measurements
- Laser Systems and Markets
- Biomedical and Safety
- Thermal Transportation
- Nanomaterials and Nanoprocessing
- Laser applications in Microelectronics.

=== LIA Today ===
LIA Today is the bimonthly newsletter published bi-monthly by LIA. The focus of the newsletter is to deliver news and important industry issues to members and laser professionals.

=== ANSI Standards ===
LIA is the ANSI-Accredited Standards Developer (ASD) of the American National Standards Institute (ANSI) Z136 series of Laser safety Standards. In addition to its role with ANSI as ASD, it is the secretariat to the ASC Z136 and the publisher and copyright holder of the Z136 standards. The Z136 Series of standards are voluntary consensus standards, with the scope of protecting against hazards associated with the use of lasers and optically radiating diodes. This body of standards are developed by a group of stakeholders consisting of the directly affected public, members of industry, and manufacturers.

List of Z136 Standards:

- Z136.1 - American National Standard for Safe Use of Lasers
- Z136.2 - American National Standard for Safe Use of Optical Fiber Communication Systems Utilizing Laser Diode and LED Sources
- Z136.3 - American National Standard for Safe Use of Lasers in Health Care
- Z136.4 - American National Standard Recommended Practice for Laser Safety Measurements for Hazard Evaluation
- Z136.5 - American National Standard for Safe Use of Lasers in Educational Institutions
- Z136.6 - American National Standard for Safe Use of Lasers Outdoors
- Z136.7 - American National Standard for Safe Use of Testing and Labeling of Laser Protective Equipment
- Z136.8 - American National Standard for Safe Use of Lasers in Research, Development, or Testing
- Z136.9 - American National Standard for Safe Use of Lasers in Manufacturing Environments
- Z136.10 - American National Standard for Safe Use of Lasers in Entertainment, Displays and Exhibitions

== See also ==
- American Institute of Physics
- European Photonics Industry Consortium
- IEEE, IEEE Photonics Society, IEEE Communications Society
- International Commission for Optics
- Photo instrumentation
- SPIE
- Optical Society of America
- Society for Imaging Science and Technology
