= Laser lighting display =

Kind of show made with laser light

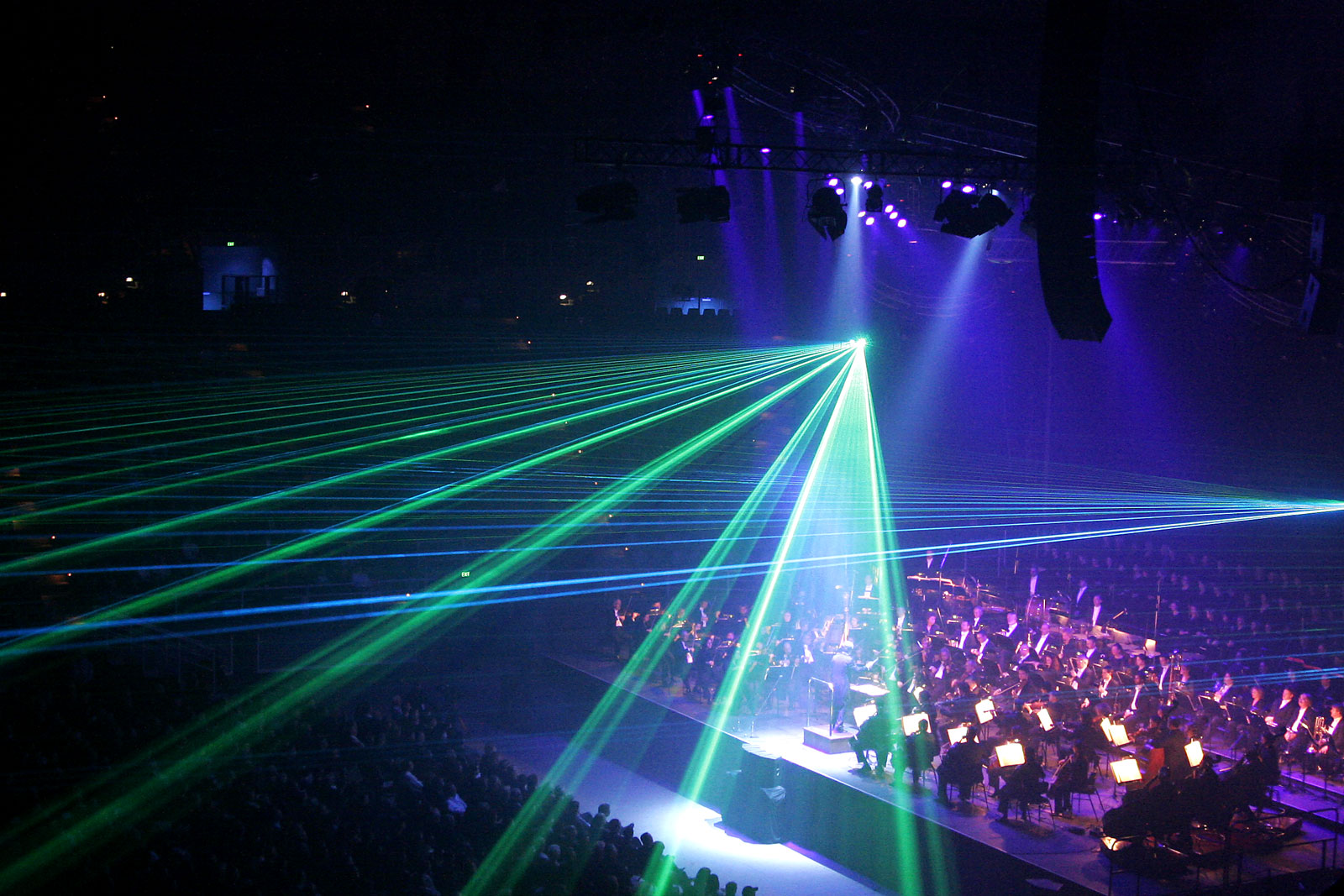
A laser show is a live multimedia performance.

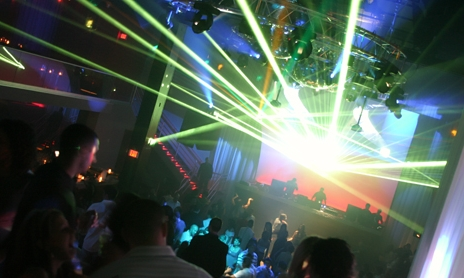
Copper vapor laser in operation. Seen in South Florida in February 2006.

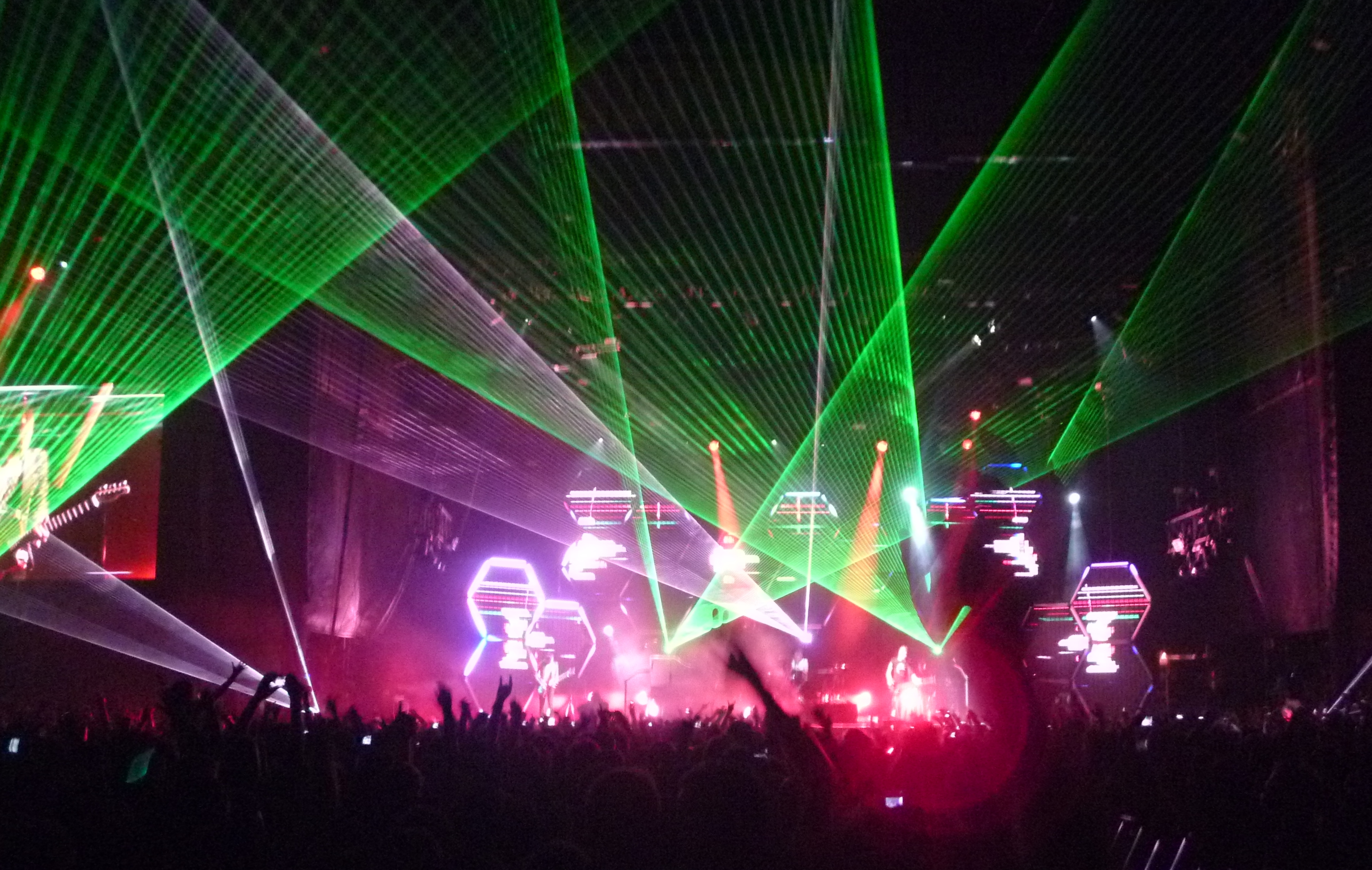
Muse on stage at Outside Lands Music and Arts Festival in San Francisco, 13 August 2011

Multimedia Laser Show in Beach Club on board of AIDAPrima

A laser lighting display or laser light show involves the use of laser light to entertain an audience. A laser light show may consist only of projected laser beams set to music, or may accompany another form of entertainment, typically musical performances.

Laser light is useful in entertainment because the coherent nature of laser light allows a narrow beam to be produced, which allows the use of optical scanning to draw patterns or images on walls, ceilings or other surfaces including theatrical smoke and fog without refocusing for the differences in distance, as is common with video projection. This inherently more focused beam is also extremely visible, and is often used as an effect. Sometimes the beams are "bounced" to different positions with mirrors to create laser sculptures.

== Function ==
=== Scanning ===
Laser scanners reflect the laser beam on small mirrors which are mounted on galvanometers to which a control voltage is applied. The beam is deflected a certain amount which correlates to the amount of voltage applied to the galvanometer scanner. Two galvanometer scanners can enable X-Y control voltages to aim the beam to any point on a square. This is called vector scanning. This enables the laser lighting designer to create patterns such as Lissajous figures (such as are often displayed on oscilloscopes); other methods of creating images through the use of galvanometer scanners and X-Y-Z control voltages can generate letters, shapes, and even complicated and intricate images. A planar or conical moving beam aimed through atmospheric smoke or fog can display a plane or cone of light known as a "laser tunnel" effect.

=== Diffraction ===
A less complicated way of spreading the laser beam is by means of diffraction. A grating splits the monochromatic light into several rays, and by using holograms, essentially complicated gratings, the beam can be split into various patterns.

Diffraction uses something referred to as the Huygens-Fresnel principle. The basic idea is that on every wavefront exists a forward propagating spherical wavelet of light. The initial wavefront manifests itself in the form of a straight line, as if the subject was seeing a wave coming in towards themselves in the water. Aspects of the spherical waves that divert sideways are cancelled with the sideways components of the wave points on each respect point on either side. Diffraction is the primary method that many simple laser projectors work. Light is projected out towards multiple points.

=== Static beams ===
Uninterrupted stationary beams from one or more laser emitters are used to create aerial beam effects, which are turned on and off at varying intervals to create a sense of excitement. As the laser beam is not manipulated in any way, this could be considered the simplest form of a laser light show and also the least dynamic. Although this method is not as commonly used today due to the availability of scanners, these shows were precursors to laser light shows.

== Safety ==
Some lasers have the potential to cause eye damage if aimed directly into the eye, or if someone were to stare directly into a stationary laser beam. Some high-power lasers used in entertainment applications can also cause burns or skin damage if enough energy is directed onto the human body and at a close enough range. In the United States, the use of lasers in entertainment, like other laser products, is regulated by the Food and Drug Administration (FDA) and additionally by some state regulatory agencies such as New York State which requires licensure of some laser operators. Safety precautions used by laser lighting professionals include beamstops and procedures so that the beam is projected above the heads of the audience. It is possible, and in some countries commonplace, to do deliberate audience scanning. In such a case, the show is supposed to be designed and analyzed to keep the beam moving, so that no harmful amount of laser energy is ever received by any individual audience member.

Lasers used outdoors can pose a risk of "flash blindness" to pilots of aircraft if too-bright light enters the cockpit. In the U.S., outdoor laser use is jointly regulated by the FDA and the Federal Aviation Administration. For details, see the article Lasers and aviation safety. In Europe the standard EN60825 is the reference concerning the conformity of the equipments of every laser-sources-production industries.

Maximum Permissible Exposure (MPE) is the maximum amount of visible laser radiation considered not to cause harm, for a given exposure time. In many European countries these exposure limits may also be a legal requirement. The MPE is 25.4W/m2 for a period of 250 milliseconds, which is equivalent to 1mW over 7mm circular aperture (the size of the human pupil).

== History ==
One of the pioneers in the use of lasers in multimedia productions was the Polish-Australian artist Joseph Stanislaus Ostoja-Kotkowski, whose explorations of their artistic possibilities at Stanford University, California, and later at the Weapons Research Establishment at Salisbury, South Australia led to his innovative 'Sound and Image' show at the 1968 Adelaide Festival of Arts.

Laser light shows fully emerged in the early 1970s and became a form of psychedelic entertainment, usually accompanied with a live musical performance on stage or pre-recorded music. The Who, Pink Floyd, Led Zeppelin, Genesis, and Electric Light Orchestra were among the first high-profile rock acts to use lasers in their concert shows in the mid-1970s. Blue Öyster Cult used laser shows on tours that supported their album Spectres, which shows a staged portrait of the band members seated among the laser beams, and Electric Light Orchestra made use of lasers during their 1978 Out of the Blue Tour which also featured the famous "Flying Saucer". This is now highly regulated in the U.S., to the point where almost no U.S. shows have laser beams that go into or close to the audience.

During the social distancing phase of the COVID-19 pandemic, some drive-in theaters offered laser shows. One company managed over 400 laser shows at locations around the United States by August 2021.

== See also ==
- International Laser Display Association
- Ivan Dryer
- Laser harp
- Liquid light shows
