= Laser safety =

Protocols for safe use, design and implementation of laser technology

A laser warning symbol

Laser radiation safety is the safe design, use and implementation of lasers to minimize the risk of laser accidents, especially those involving eye injuries. Since even relatively small amounts of laser light can lead to permanent eye injuries, the sale and usage of lasers is typically subject to government regulations.

Moderate and high-power lasers are potentially hazardous because they can burn the retina, or even the skin. To control the risk of injury, various specifications, for example 21 Code of Federal Regulations (CFR) Part 1040 in the US and IEC 60825 internationally, define "classes" of laser depending on their power and wavelength. These regulations impose upon manufacturers required safety measures, such as labeling lasers with specific warnings, and wearing laser safety goggles when operating lasers. Consensus standards, such as American National Standards Institute (ANSI) Z136, provide users with control measures for laser hazards, as well as various tables helpful in calculating maximum permissible exposure (MPE) limits and accessible exposures limits (AELs).

Thermal effects are the predominant cause of laser radiation injury, but photo-chemical effects can also be of concern for specific wavelengths of laser radiation. Even moderately powered lasers can cause injury to the eye. High power lasers can also burn the skin. Some lasers are so powerful that even the diffuse reflection from a surface can be hazardous to the eye.

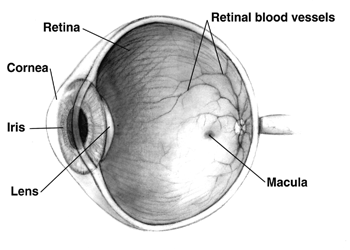
Diagram of a human eye

The coherence and low divergence angle of laser light, aided by focusing from the lens of an eye, can cause laser radiation to be concentrated into an extremely small spot on the retina. A transient increase of only +10°C (+18°F) can destroy retinal photoreceptor cells. If the laser is sufficiently powerful, permanent damage can occur within a fraction of a second, which is faster than the blink of an eye. Sufficiently powerful lasers in the visible to near infrared range (400-1400 nm) will penetrate the eyeball and may cause heating of the retina, whereas exposure to laser radiation with wavelengths less than 400 nm or greater than 1400 nm are largely absorbed by the cornea and lens, leading to the development of cataracts or burn injuries.

Infrared lasers are particularly hazardous, since the body's protective glare aversion response, also referred to as the "blink reflex," is triggered only by visible light. For example, some people exposed to high power Nd:YAG lasers emitting invisible 1064 nm radiation may not feel pain or notice immediate damage to their eyesight. A pop or click noise emanating from the eyeball may be the only indication that retinal damage has occurred, i.e. the retina was heated to over 100 °C (212 °F) resulting in localized explosive boiling accompanied by the immediate creation of a permanent blind spot.

== Damage mechanisms ==
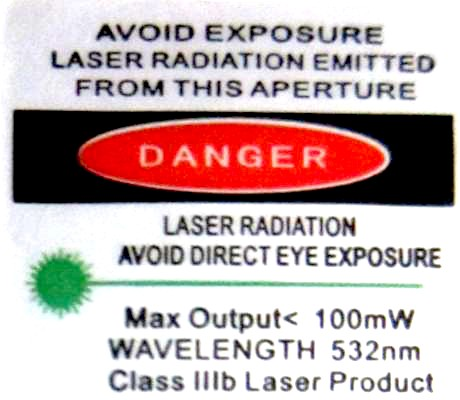
A typical US (ANSI) laser warning label

Lasers can cause damage in biological tissues, both to the eye and to the skin, due to several mechanisms. Thermal damage, or burn, occurs when tissues are heated to the point where denaturation of proteins occurs. Another mechanism is photochemical damage, where light triggers chemical reactions in tissue. Photochemical damage occurs mostly with short-wavelength (blue and ultraviolet) light and can be accumulated over the course of hours. Laser pulses shorter than about 1 μs can cause a rapid rise in temperature, resulting in explosive boiling of water. The shock wave from the explosion can subsequently cause damage relatively far away from the point of impact. Ultrashort pulses can also exhibit self-focusing in the transparent parts of the eye, leading to an increase of the damage potential compared to longer pulses with the same energy. Photoionization proved to be the main mechanism of radiation damage at the use of titanium-sapphire laser.

The eye focuses visible and near-infrared light onto the retina. A laser beam can be focused to an intensity on the retina which may be up to 200,000 times higher than at the point where the laser beam enters the eye. Most of the light is absorbed by melanin pigments in the pigment epithelium just behind the photoreceptors, and causes burns in the retina. Ultraviolet light with wavelengths shorter than 400 nm tends to be absorbed by lens and 300 nm in the cornea, where it can produce injuries at relatively low powers due to photochemical damage. Infrared light mainly causes thermal damage to the retina at near-infrared wavelengths and to more frontal parts of the eye at longer wavelengths. The table below summarizes the various medical conditions caused by lasers at different wavelengths, not including injuries due to pulsed lasers.

Wavelength range	Pathological effect
180–315 nm (UV-B, UV-C)	Photokeratitis (inflammation of the cornea, equivalent to sunburn)
315–400 nm (UV-A)	Photochemical cataract (clouding of the eye lens)
400–780 nm (visible)	Photochemical damage to the retina, retinal burn
780–1400 nm (near-IR)	Cataract, retinal burn
1.4–3.0 μm (IR)	Aqueous flare (protein in the aqueous humour), cataract, corneal burn
3.0 μm–1 mm	Corneal burn

The skin is usually much less sensitive to laser light than the eye, but excessive exposure to ultraviolet light from any source (laser or non-laser) can cause short- and long-term effects similar to sunburn, while visible and infrared wavelengths are mainly harmful due to thermal damage.

== Lasers and aviation safety ==
Researchers at the United States Federal Aviation Administration (FAA) compiled a database of more than 400 reported incidents occurring between 1990 and 2004 in which pilots have been startled, distracted, temporarily blinded, or disoriented by laser exposure. This information led to an inquiry in the US Congress. Exposure to hand-held laser light under such circumstances may seem trivial given the brevity of exposure, the large distances involved and beam spread of up to several metres. However, laser exposure may create dangerous conditions such as flash blindness. If this occurs during a critical moment in aircraft operation, the aircraft may be endangered. In addition, some 18% to 35% of the population possess the autosomal dominant genetic trait, photic sneeze, that causes the affected individual to experience an involuntary sneezing fit when exposed to a sudden flash of light.

== Maximum permissible exposure ==
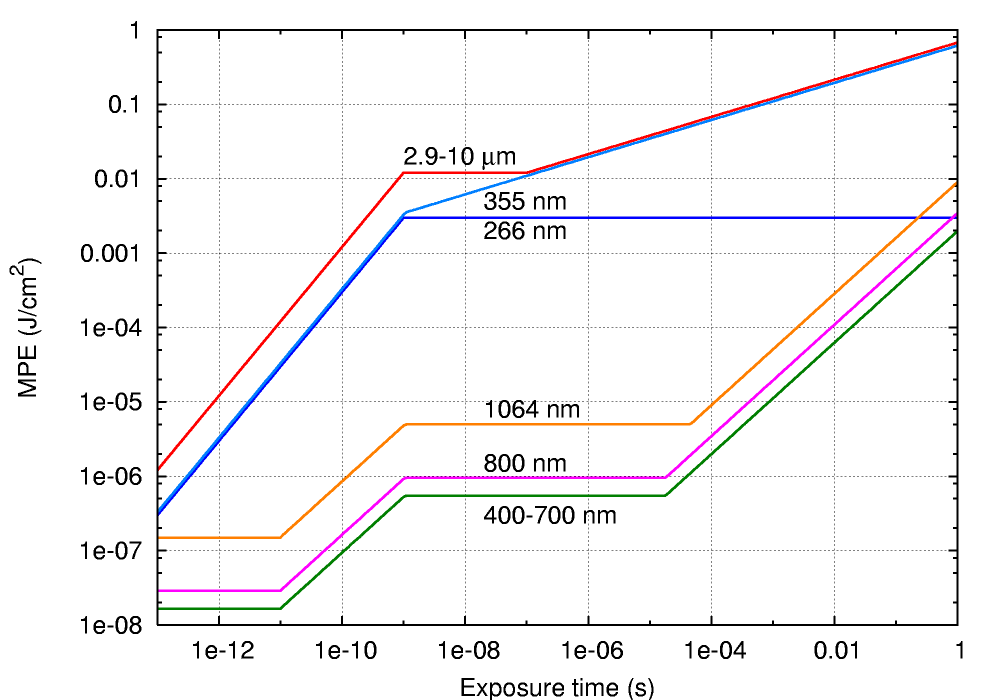
Maximum permissible exposure (MPE) at the cornea for a collimated laser beam according to IEC 60825, as energy density versus exposure time for various wavelengths

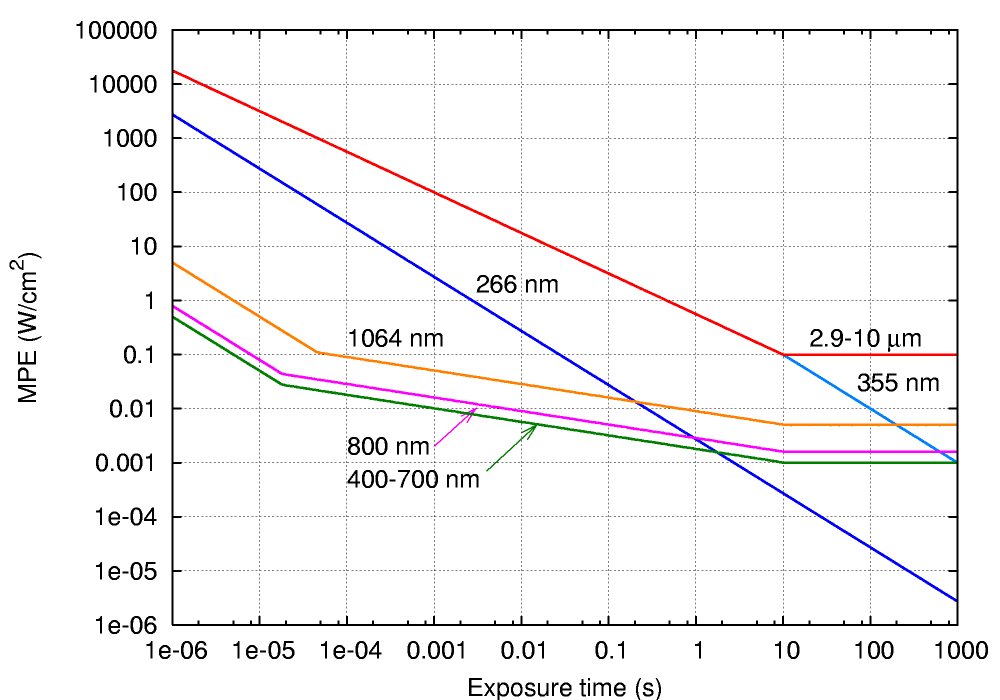
MPE as power density versus exposure time for various wavelengths

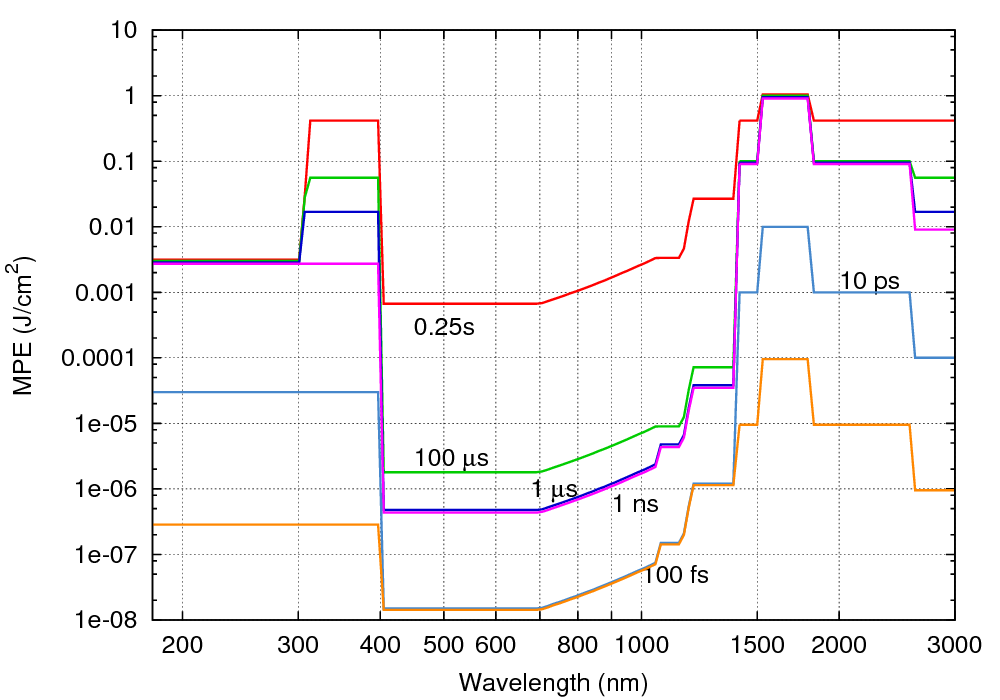
MPE as energy density versus wavelength for various exposure times (pulse durations)

The maximum permissible exposure (MPE) is the highest power or energy density (in W/cm^{2} or J/cm^{2}) of a light source that is considered safe, i.e. that has a negligible probability for creating damage. It is usually about 10% of the dose that has a 50% chance of creating damage under worst-case conditions. The MPE is measured at the cornea of the human eye or at the skin, for a given wavelength and exposure time.

A calculation of the MPE for ocular exposure takes into account the various ways light can act upon the eye. For example, deep-ultraviolet light causes accumulating damage, even at very low powers. Infrared light with a wavelength longer than about 1400 nm is absorbed by the transparent parts of the eye before it reaches the retina, which means that the MPE for these wavelengths is higher than for visible light. In addition to the wavelength and exposure time, the MPE takes into account the spatial distribution of the light (from a laser or otherwise). Collimated laser beams of visible and near-infrared light are especially dangerous at relatively low powers because the lens focuses the light onto a tiny spot on the retina. Light sources with a smaller degree of spatial coherence than a well-collimated laser beam, such as high-power LEDs, lead to a distribution of the light over a larger area on the retina. For such sources, the MPE is higher than for collimated laser beams. In the MPE calculation, the worst-case scenario is assumed, in which the eye lens focuses the light into the smallest possible spot size on the retina for the particular wavelength and the pupil is fully open. Although the MPE is specified as power or energy per unit surface, it is based on the power or energy that can pass through a fully open pupil (0.39 cm^{2}) for visible and near-infrared wavelengths. This is relevant for laser beams that have a cross-section smaller than 0.39 cm^{2}. The IEC-60825-1 and ANSI Z136.1 standards include methods of calculating MPEs.

== Regulations ==
In various jurisdictions, standards bodies, legislation, and government regulations define classes of laser according to the risks associated with them, and define required safety measures for people who may be exposed to those lasers.

In the European Community (EC), eye protection requirements are specified in European standard EN 207 and the maximal laser light intensities in EN 60825. In addition, European standard EN 208 specifies requirements for goggles for use during beam alignment. These transmit a portion of the laser light, permitting the operator to see where the beam is, and do not provide complete protection against a direct laser beam hit.

In the US, guidance for the use of protective eyewear, and other elements of safe laser use, is given in the ANSI Z136 series of standards. These consensus standards are intended for laser users, and full copies can be purchased directly from ANSI or the official Secretariat to the Accredited Standards Committee (ASC) Z136 and Publisher of this series of ANSI standards, the Laser Institute of America. The standards are as follows:

- ANSI Z136.1 – Safe Use of Lasers

As the parent document of the Z136 series of laser safety standards, the Z136.1 is the foundation of laser safety programs for industry, military, research and development (labs), and higher education (universities).

- ANSI Z136.2 – Safe Use of Optical Fiber Communication Systems Utilizing Laser Diode and LED Sources

This standard provides guidance for the safe use, maintenance, service, and installation of optical communications systems utilizing laser diodes or light emitting diodes operating at wavelengths between 0.6 μm and 1 mm. Optical communication systems include end-to-end optical fiber based links, fixed terrestrial point-to-point free-space links, or a combination of both.

- ANSI Z136.3 – Safe Use of Lasers in Health Care

Provides guidance for individuals who work with high power Class 3B and Class 4 lasers and laser systems in health care.

- ANSI Z136.4 – Recommended Practice for Laser Safety Measurements for Hazard Evaluation

Provides guidance for measurement procedures necessary for the classification and evaluation of optical radiation hazards.

- ANSI Z136.5 – Safe Use of Lasers in Educational Institutions

Addresses laser safety concerns in educational settings.

- ANSI Z136.6 – Safe Use of Lasers Outdoors

Provides guidance for the safe use of lasers in an outdoor environment, e.g., construction, displays/laser lightshows, scientific/astronomical research, and military.

- ANSI Z136.7 – Testing and Labeling of Laser Protective Equipment

Provides reasonable and adequate guidance on the test methods and protocols used to provide eye protection from lasers and laser systems.

- ANSI Z136.8 – Safe Use of Lasers in Research, Development, or Testing

Provides guidance for the safe use of lasers and laser systems found in research, development, or testing environments, where safety controls common for commercial lasers may either be missing or disabled.

- ANSI Z136.9 – Safe Use of Lasers in Manufacturing Environments

Intended to protect individuals with the potential for laser exposure when lasers are used in manufacturing environments, this standard includes policies and procedures to ensure laser safety in both public and private industries as well as product development along with testing.

Through 21 CFR 1040, the US Food and Drug Administration (FDA) regulates laser products entering commerce and requires all class IIIb and class IV lasers offered in commerce in the US to have five standard safety features: a key switch, a safety interlock dongle, a power indicator, an aperture shutter, and an emission delay (normally two to three seconds). OEM lasers, designed to be parts of other components (such as DVD burners), are exempt from this requirement. Some non-portable lasers may not have a safety dongle or an emission delay, but have an emergency stop button and/or a remote switch.

== Classification ==
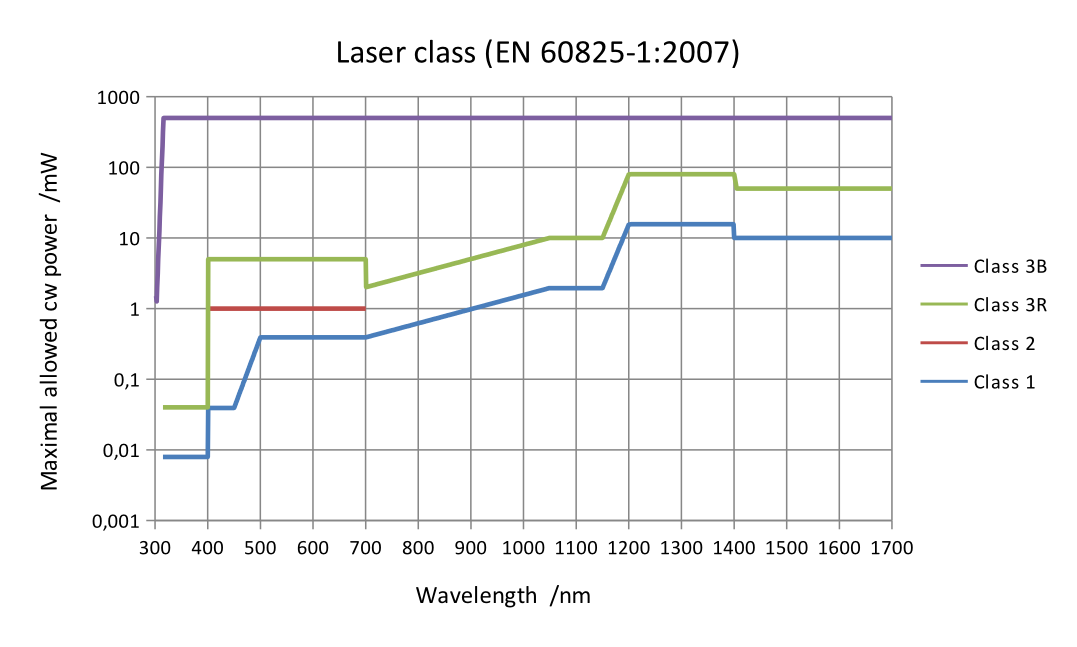
The maximal allowed cw-powers for the laser classes 1, 2, 3R and 3B according to the standard EN 60825-1:2007. Note that these values hold only for static, point-like laser sources (i.e. collimated or weakly divergent laser beams).

Lasers have been classified by wavelength and power into four classes and a few subclasses since the early 1970s. The classifications categorize lasers according to their ability to produce damage in exposed people, from class 1 (no hazard during normal use) to class 4 (severe hazard for eyes and skin). There are two classification systems, the "old system" used before 2002, and the "revised system" being phased in since 2002. The latter reflects the greater knowledge of lasers that has been accumulated since the original classification system was devised, and permits certain types of lasers to be recognized as having a lower hazard than was implied by their placement in the original classification system. The revised system is part of the revised IEC 60825 standard. From 2007, the revised system is also incorporated into the US-oriented ANSI Laser Safety Standard (ANSI Z136.1). Since 2007, labeling according to the revised system is accepted by the FDA on laser products imported into the US. The old and revised systems can be distinguished by the 1M, 2M and 3R classes used only in the revised system and the 2A and 3A classes used only in the old system. Class numbers were designated using Roman numerals (I–IV) in the US under the old system and Arabic numerals (1–4) in the EU. The revised system uses Arabic numerals (1–4) in all jurisdictions.

The classification of a laser is based on the concept of accessible emission limits (AEL) that are defined for each laser class. This is usually a maximum power (in W) or energy (in J) that can be emitted in a specified wavelength range and exposure time that passes through a specified aperture stop at a specified distance. For infrared wavelengths above 4 μm, it is specified as a maximum power density (in W/m^{2}). It is the responsibility of the manufacturer to provide the correct classification of a laser, and to equip the laser with appropriate warning labels and safety measures as prescribed by the regulations. Safety measures used with the more powerful lasers include key-controlled operation, warning lights to indicate laser light emission, a beam stop or attenuator, and an electrical contact that the user can connect to an emergency stop or interlock.

=== IEC 60825-1 ===
Warning label for class 2 and higher

Below, the main characteristics and requirements for the classification system as specified by the IEC 60825-1 standard are listed, along with typical required warning labels. Additionally, classes 2 and higher must have the triangular warning label shown here, and other labels are required in specific cases indicating laser emission, laser apertures, skin hazards, and invisible wavelengths. For classes I to IV, see the section old system further below.

==== Class 1 ====
CLASS 1 LASER PRODUCT

A Class 1 laser is safe under all conditions of normal use. This means the maximum permissible exposure (MPE) cannot be exceeded when viewing a laser with the naked eye or with the aid of typical magnifying optics (e.g. telescope or microscope). To verify compliance, the standard specifies the aperture and distance corresponding to the naked eye, a typical telescope viewing a collimated beam, and a typical microscope viewing a divergent beam. Certain lasers classified as Class 1 may still pose a hazard when viewed with a telescope or microscope of sufficiently large aperture. For example, a high-power laser with a very large collimated beam or very highly divergent beam may be classified as Class 1 if the power that passes through the apertures defined in the standard is less than the AEL for Class 1; however, an unsafe power level may be collected by a magnifying optic with larger aperture. Often, devices such as optical drives will be considered class 1 if they fully contain the beam of a more powerful, higher-class laser, such that no light escapes under normal use.

==== Class 1M ====
LASER RADIATION
DO NOT VIEW DIRECTLY WITH OPTICAL INSTRUMENTS
CLASS 1M LASER PRODUCT

A Class 1M laser is safe for all conditions of use except when passed through magnifying optics such as microscopes and telescopes. Class 1M lasers produce large-diameter beams, or beams that are divergent. The MPE for a Class 1M laser cannot normally be exceeded unless focusing or imaging optics are used to narrow the beam. If the beam is refocused, the hazard of Class 1M lasers may be increased and the product class may be changed. A laser can be classified as Class 1M if the power that can pass through the pupil of the naked eye is less than the AEL for Class 1, but the power that can be collected into the eye by typical magnifying optics (as defined in the standard) is higher than the AEL for Class 1 and lower than the AEL for Class 3B.

==== Class 2 ====
LASER RADIATION
DO NOT STARE INTO BEAM
CLASS 2 LASER PRODUCT

A Class 2 laser is considered to be safe because the blink reflex (glare aversion response to bright lights) will limit the exposure to no more than 0.25 seconds. It only applies to visible-light lasers (400–700 nm). Class 2 lasers are limited to 1 mW continuous wave, or more if the emission time is less than 0.25 seconds or if the light is not spatially coherent. Intentional suppression of the blink reflex could lead to eye injury. Some laser pointers and measuring instruments are class 2.

==== Class 2M ====
LASER RADIATION
DO NOT STARE INTO BEAM OR VIEW
DIRECTLY WITH OPTICAL INSTRUMENTS
CLASS 2M LASER PRODUCT

A Class 2M laser is safe because of the blink reflex if not viewed through optical instruments. As with class 1M, this applies to laser beams with a large diameter or large divergence, for which the amount of light passing through the pupil cannot exceed the limits for class 2.

==== Class 3R ====
LASER RADIATION
AVOID DIRECT EYE EXPOSURE
CLASS 3R LASER PRODUCT

A Class 3R laser is considered safe if handled carefully, with restricted beam viewing. With a class 3R laser, the MPE can be exceeded, but with a low risk of injury. Visible continuous lasers in Class 3R are limited to 5 mW. For other wavelengths and for pulsed lasers, other limits apply.

==== Class 3B ====
LASER RADIATION
AVOID EXPOSURE TO BEAM
CLASS 3B LASER PRODUCT

A Class 3B laser is hazardous if the eye is exposed directly, but diffuse reflections such as those from paper or other matte surfaces are not harmful. The AEL for continuous lasers in the wavelength range from 315 nm to far infrared is 0.5 W. For pulsed lasers between 400 and 700 nm, the limit is 30 mJ. Other limits apply to other wavelengths and to ultrashort pulsed lasers. Protective eyewear is typically required where direct viewing of a class 3B laser beam may occur. Class-3B lasers must be equipped with a key switch and a safety interlock. Class 3B lasers are used inside CD and DVD writers, although the writer unit itself is class 1 because the laser light cannot leave the unit.

==== Class 4 ====
LASER RADIATION
AVOID EYE OR SKIN EXPOSURE TO
DIRECT OR SCATTERED RADIATION
CLASS 4 LASER PRODUCT

Class 4 is the highest and most dangerous class of laser, including all lasers that exceed the Class 3B AEL. By definition, a class 4 laser can burn the skin, or cause devastating and permanent eye damage as a result of direct, diffuse or indirect beam viewing. These lasers may ignite combustible materials, and thus may represent a fire risk. These hazards may also apply to indirect or non-specular reflections of the beam, even from apparently matte surfaces – meaning that great care must be taken to control the beam path. Class 4 lasers must be equipped with a key switch and a safety interlock. Most industrial, scientific, military, and medical lasers are in this category. Medical lasers can have divergent emissions and require awareness of nominal ocular hazard distance (NOHD) and nominal ocular hazard area (NOHA).

=== Old system ===
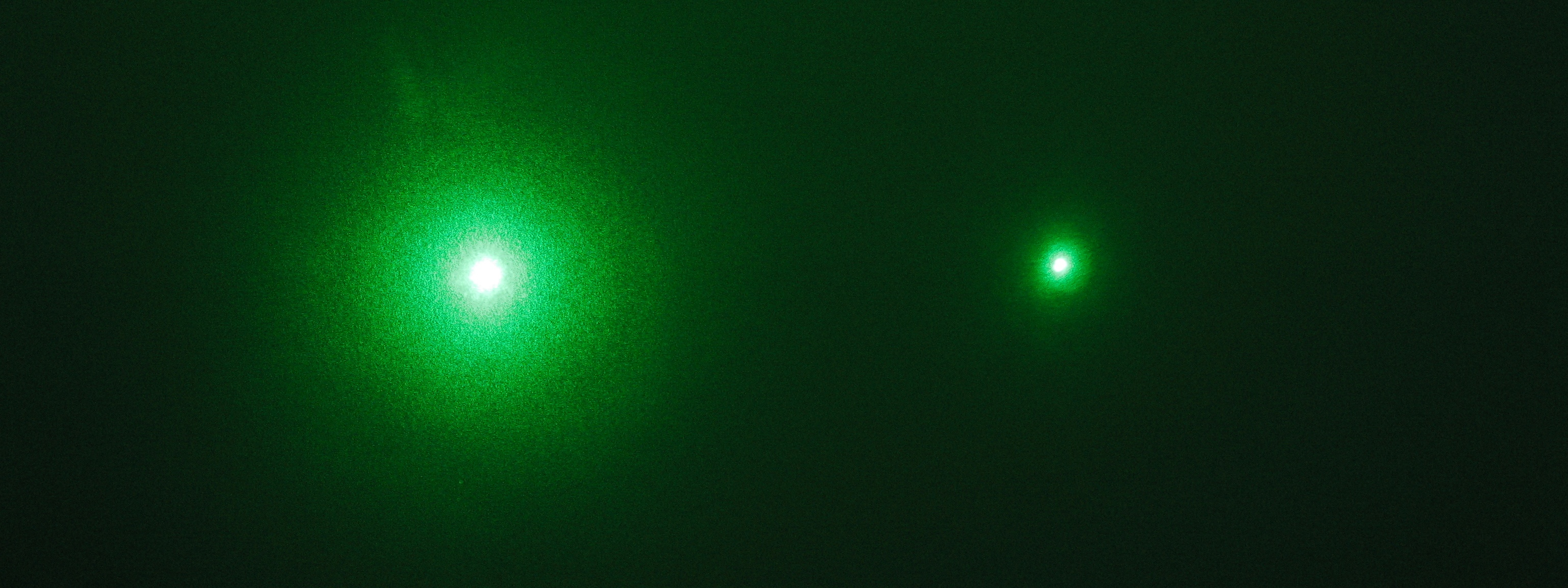
Green laser – class IIIb compared to class IIIa

The safety classes in the "old system" of classification were established in the United States through consensus standards (ANSI Z136.1) and federal and state regulations. The international classification described in consensus standards such as IEC 825 (later IEC 60825) was based on the same concepts, but presented with designations slightly different from the US classification.

This classification system is only slightly altered from the original system developed in the early 1970s. It is still used by US laser product safety regulations. The laser powers mentioned are typical values. Classification is also dependent on the wavelength and on whether the laser is pulsed or continuous. For laser classes 1 to 4, see the section on the revised system above.

==== Class I ====
Inherently safe; no possibility of eye damage. This can be either because of a low output power (in which case eye damage is impossible even after hours of exposure), or due to an enclosure preventing user access to the laser beam during normal operation, such as in CD players or laser printers.

==== Class II ====
The blink reflex of the human eye (aversion response) will prevent eye damage, unless the person deliberately stares into the beam for an extended period. Output power may be up to 1 mW. This class includes only lasers that emit visible light. Some laser pointers are in this category.

==== Class IIa ====
A region in the low-power end of Class II where the laser requires in excess of 1000 seconds of continuous viewing to produce a burn to the retina. Commercial laser scanners are in this subclass.

==== Class IIIa ====
Lasers in this class are mostly dangerous in combination with optical instruments which change the beam diameter or power density, though even without optical instrument enhancement, direct contact with the eye for over two minutes may cause serious damage to the retina. Output power does not exceed 5 mW. Beam power density may not exceed 2.5 mW/cm^{2} if the device is not labeled with a "caution" warning label, otherwise a "danger" warning label is required. Many laser sights for firearms and laser pointers commonly used for presentations are in this category.

==== Class IIIb ====
Lasers in this class may cause damage if the beam enters the eye directly. This generally applies to lasers powered from 5–500 mW. Lasers in this category can cause permanent eye damage with exposures of 1/100 of a second or more, depending on the strength of the laser. A diffuse reflection is generally not hazardous, but specular reflections can be just as dangerous as direct exposures. Protective eyewear is recommended when direct beam viewing of Class IIIb lasers may occur. Lasers at the high power end of this class may also present a fire hazard and can lightly burn skin.

==== Class IV ====
Lasers in this class have output powers of more than 500 mW in the beam and may cause severe, permanent damage to eye or skin without being focussed by optics of eye or instrumentation. Diffuse reflections of the laser beam can be hazardous to skin or eye within the nominal hazard zone. (The nominal hazard zone is the area around a laser in which the applicable MPE is exceeded.) Many industrial, scientific, military and medical lasers are in this category.

== Safety measures ==
=== General precautions ===
Many scientists involved with lasers agree on the following guidelines:

- Everyone who uses a laser should be aware of the risks. This awareness is not just a matter of time spent with lasers; to the contrary, long-term dealing with invisible risks (such as from infrared laser beams) tends to reduce risk awareness, rather than to sharpen it, primarily due to complacency.
- Optical experiments should be carried out on an optical table with all laser beams travelling in the horizontal plane only, and all beams should be stopped at the edges of the table. Users should never put their eyes at the level of the horizontal plane where the beams are, in case of reflected beams that leave the table.
- Watches, and other jewelry that might enter the optical plane, should not be allowed in the laboratory. All non-optical objects that are close to the optical plane should have a matte finish in order to prevent specular reflections.
- Adequate eye protection should always be required for everyone in the room if there is a significant risk for eye injury.
- High-intensity beams that can cause fire or skin damage (mainly from class 4 and ultraviolet lasers) and that are not frequently modified should be guided through opaque tubes.
- Alignment of beams and optical components should be performed at a reduced beam power whenever possible.

=== Protective eyewear ===
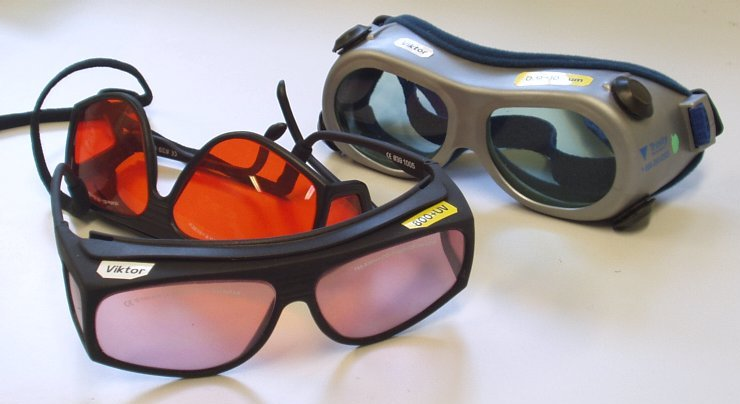
Laser goggles

The use of eye protection when operating lasers of classes 3B and 4 in a manner that may result in eye exposure above the MPE is required in the workplace by the US Occupational Safety and Health Administration.

Protective eyewear in the form of appropriately filtering optics can protect the eyes from the reflected or scattered laser light with a hazardous beam power, as well as from direct exposure to a laser beam. Eyewear must be selected for the specific type of laser, to block or attenuate in the appropriate wavelength range. For example, eyewear absorbing 532 nm (green laser) typically has an orange appearance (although one should never rely solely on the lens color when selecting laser eye protection), transmitting wavelengths larger than 550 nm. Such eyewear would be useless as protection against lasers emitting at wavelengths over 723 nm (infrared (ie, invisible) lasers). Furthermore, some lasers emit more than one wavelength of light, and this may be a particular problem with some less expensive frequency-doubled lasers, such as 532 nm "green laser pointers" which are commonly pumped by 808 nm infrared laser diodes, and also generate the fundamental 1064 nm laser beam which is used to produce the final 532 nm output. If the IR radiation is allowed into the beam, which happens in some green laser pointers, it will in general not be blocked by regular red or orange-colored protective eyewear designed for pure green or already IR-filtered beam. Special YAG laser and dual-frequency eyewear are available for work with frequency-doubled YAG and other IR lasers which have a visible beam, but it is more expensive, and IR-pumped green laser products do not always specify whether such extra protection is needed.

Eyewear is rated for optical density (OD), which is the base-10 logarithm of the attenuation factor by which the optical filter reduces beam power. For example, eyewear with OD 3 will reduce the beam power in the specified wavelength range by a factor of 1000. In addition to an optical density sufficient to reduce beam power to below the maximum permissible exposure (see above), laser eyewear used where direct beam exposure is possible should be able to withstand a direct hit from the laser beam without breaking. The protective specifications (wavelengths and optical densities) are usually printed on the goggles, generally near the top of the unit. In the European Community, manufacturers are required by European standard EN 207 to specify the maximum power rating rather than the optical density. Always wear safety goggles.

=== Interlocks and automatic shutdown ===
Interlocks are circuits that stop the laser beam if some condition is not met, such as if the laser casing or a room door is open. Class 3B and 4 lasers typically provide a connection for an external interlock circuit. Many lasers are considered class 1 only because the light is contained within an interlocked enclosure, like DVD drives or portable CD players.

Some systems have electronics that automatically shut down the laser under other conditions. For example, some fiber-optic communication systems have circuits that automatically shut down transmission if a fiber is disconnected or broken.

=== Laser-safety officer ===
In many jurisdictions, organizations that operate lasers are required to appoint a laser-safety officer (LSO). The LSO is responsible for ensuring that safety regulations are followed by all other workers in the organization.

== Laser pointers ==
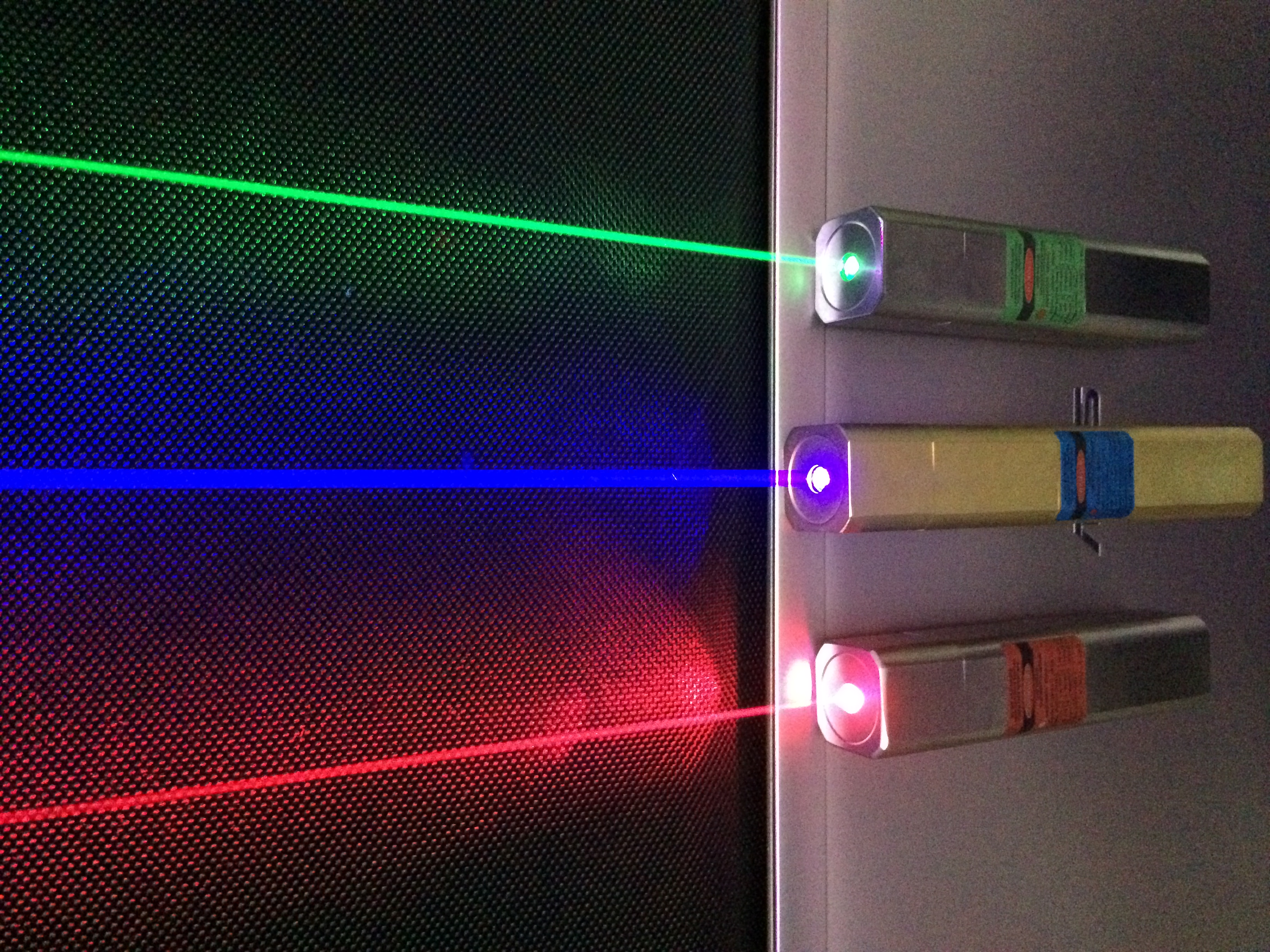
Laser pointers

In the period from 1999 to 2016, increasing attention has been paid to the risks posed by so-called laser pointers and laser pens. Typically, the sale of laser pointers is restricted to either class 3A (<5 mW) or class 2 (<1 mW), depending on local regulations. For example, in the US, Canada and the UK, class 3A is the maximum permitted, unless a key actuated control or other safety features are provided. In Australia, class 2 is the maximum allowed class. However, because enforcement is often not very strict, laser pointers of class 2 and above are often available for sale even in countries where they are not allowed.

Van Norren et al. (1998) could not find a single example in the medical literature of a <1 mW class III laser causing eyesight damage. Mainster et al. (2003) provide one case, an 11-year-old child who temporarily damaged her eyesight by holding an approximately 5 mW red laser pointer close to the eye and staring into the beam for 10 seconds; she experienced scotoma (a blind spot) but fully recovered after three months. Luttrull & Hallisey (1999) describe a similar case, a 34-year-old male who stared into the beam of a class IIIa 5 mW red laser for 30 to 60 seconds, causing temporary central scotoma and visual field loss. His eyesight fully recovered within two days, at the time of his eye exam. An intravenous fundus fluorescein angiogram, a technique used by ophthalmologists to visualise the retina of the eye in fine detail, identified subtle discoloration of the fovea.

Thus, it appears that a brief 0.25-second exposure to a <5 mW laser such as found in red laser pointers does not pose a threat to eye health. On the other hand, there is a potential for injury if a person deliberately stares into a beam of a class IIIa laser a for few seconds or more at close range. Even if injury occurs, most people will fully recover their vision. Further experienced discomforts than these may be psychological rather than physical. With regard to green laser pointers the safe exposure time may be less, and with even higher powered lasers instant permanent damage should be expected. These conclusions must be qualified with recent theoretical observations that certain prescription medications may interact with some wavelengths of laser light, causing increased sensitivity (phototoxicity).

Beyond the question of physical injury to the eye from a laser pointer, several other undesirable effects are possible. These include short-lived flash blindness if the beam is encountered in darkened surroundings, as when driving at night. This may result in momentary loss of vehicular control. Lasers pointed at aircraft are a hazard to aviation. A police officer seeing a red dot on their chest may conclude that a sniper is targeting them and take aggressive action. In addition, the startle reflex exhibited by some exposed unexpectedly to laser light of this sort has been reported to have resulted in cases of self-injury or loss of control. For these and similar reasons, the US Food and Drug Administration has advised that laser pointers are not toys and should not be used by minors except under the direct supervision of an adult.

== Fibre optics for communications ==
Fibre optic laser safety is characterised by the fact that in normal operation the light beam is inaccessible, so something has to be unplugged or broken for it to become accessible. The resultant exit beam is quite divergent, so eye safety is highly dependent on distance, and if a magnifying device is used.

In practice, accidental exposure to the large majority of installed systems is unlikely to have any health impact, since power levels are usually below 1 mW and the wavelength in the infra-red, e.g. Class 1. However, there are a few significant exceptions.

Most single mode/multi mode fiber systems actually use infra-red light, invisible to the human eye. In this case, there is no eye aversion response. A special case is systems operating at 670–1000 nm, where the beam may appear to be a dull red, even if the light beam is actually very intense. Technicians may also use red lasers for fault finding at around 628–670 nm. These can create a significant hazard if viewed incorrectly, particularly if they are abnormally high power. Such visible fault finders are usually classified as Class 2 up to 1 mW, and Class 2M up to 10 mW.

High power optical amplifiers are used in long distance systems. They use internal pump lasers with power levels up to a few watts, which is a major hazard. However, these power levels are contained within the amplifier module. Any system employing typical optical connectors (i.e. not expanded beam) cannot typically exceed about 100 mW, above which power level single mode connectors become unreliable, so if there is a single mode connector in the system, the design power level will always be below this level, even if no other details are known. An additional factor with these systems is that light around the 1550 nm wavelength band (common for optical amplifiers) is regarded as relatively low risk, since the eye fluids absorb the light before it is focused on the retina. This tends to reduce the overall risk factor of such systems.

Optical microscopes and magnifying devices also present unique safety challenges. If any optical power is present, and a simple magnifying device is used to examine the fiber end, then the user is no longer protected by beam divergence, since the entire beam may be imaged onto the eye. Therefore, simple magnifying devices should never be used in such situations. Optical connector inspection microscopes are available which incorporate blocking filters, thus greatly improving eye safety. The most recent such design also incorporates protection against red fault locating lasers.

== Non-beam hazards – electrical and other ==
While most of the danger of lasers comes from the beam itself, there are certain non-beam hazards that are often associated with use of laser systems. Many lasers are high voltage devices, typically 400 V upward for a small 5 mJ pulsed laser, and exceeding many kilovolts in higher powered lasers. This, coupled with high pressure water for cooling the laser and other associated electrical equipment, can create a greater hazard than the laser beam itself.

Electric equipment should generally be installed at least 250 mm (10 inches) above the floor to reduce electric risk in the case of flooding. Optical tables, lasers, and other equipment should be well grounded. Enclosure interlocks should be respected and special precautions taken during troubleshooting.

In addition to the electrical hazards, lasers may create chemical, mechanical, and other hazards specific to particular installations. Chemical hazards may include materials intrinsic to the laser, such as beryllium oxide in argon ion laser tubes, halogens in excimer lasers, organic dyes dissolved in toxic or flammable solvents in dye lasers, and heavy metal vapors and asbestos insulation in helium cadmium lasers. They may also include materials released during laser processing, such as metal fumes from cutting or surface treatments of metals or the complex mix of decomposition products produced in the high energy plasma of a laser cutting plastics.

Mechanical hazards may include moving parts in vacuum and pressure pumps; implosion or explosion of flashlamps, plasma tubes, water jackets, and gas handling equipment.

High temperatures and fire hazards may also result from the operation of high-powered Class IIIB or any Class IV Laser.

In commercial laser systems, hazard mitigations such as the presence of fusible plugs, thermal interrupters, and pressure relief valves reduce the hazard of, for example, a steam explosion arising from an obstructed water cooling jacket. Interlocks, shutters, and warning lights are often critical elements of modern commercial installations. In older lasers, experimental and hobby systems, and those removed from other equipment (OEM units) special care must be taken to anticipate and reduce the consequences of misuse as well as various failure modes.

== See also ==
- Lasers and aviation safety
- Laser weapon
- Audience scanning – use of lasers in light shows, where they are deliberately directed into the audience to create special effects
