= Photo instrumentation =

Recording diagnostic information via a photograph process

Photo instrumentation refers to recording information of a diagnostic nature via a photographic process. The information recorded is usually used to determine the motion of a particular object through the camera's field of view. The camera is typically a high-speed still camera, or motion picture and video cameras, or other specialized devices.

== Applications ==
One of today's most common applications is the car crash test. Measurements of the object's position in successive pictures provide the object's motion. The time interval between the pictures is also known, and so the object's speed and direction can be determined. Information on the object's motion, combined with its known physical characteristics, such as size and weight, allows calculation of many parameters including velocity and force for any desired points within the image. The motion of individual elements of an object can also be determined. The "photo instrumentation" provides both quantitative (numeric) and qualitative (descriptive) information that helps the observer understand the event.

Similar techniques have been used to study how hummingbirds hover.

== Instrumentation ==
Cameras range from conventional single picture cameras to 'movie cameras' that take over 2 million pictures per second. Specialized optics, illuminations, and films are used to record images of things that the eye cannot see such as movement of air, surface temperature of objects, and stress patterns. Cameras can be used in environments where humans cannot go.
