= Flash blindness =

Temporary blindness after a flash

Flash blindness is an either temporary or permanent visual impairment during and following exposure of a varying length of time to a light flash of extremely high intensity, such as a nuclear explosion, flash photograph, lightning strike, or extremely bright light, i.e. a searchlight, laser pointer, landing lights, the Sun, or ultraviolet light. The bright light overwhelms the retinas of the eyes and generally gradually fades, lasting anywhere from a few seconds to a few minutes. However, if the eyes are exposed to a high enough level of light, such as a nuclear explosion, the blindness can become permanent.

Flash blindness may also occur in everyday life. For example, the subject of a flash photograph can be temporarily flash blinded. This phenomenon is leveraged in non-lethal weapons such as flash grenades and laser dazzlers.

== Cause ==
Flash blindness is caused by bleaching (oversaturation) of the retinal pigment. As the pigment returns to normal, so too does sight. In daylight the eye's pupil constricts, thus reducing the amount of light entering after a flash. At night, the dark-adapted pupil is wide open, so flash blindness has a greater effect and lasts longer.

== Temporary vs. permanent ==
Depending on the source consulted, the term "flash blindness" may exclusively refer to a temporary condition, or may describe a potentially permanent one. Some sources, such as NATO and the U.S. Department of Defense, state that "flash blindness" can be temporary or permanent. Other sources restrict the use of the word to temporary, reversible vision loss, distinguishing it from permanent blindness in a hierarchy of effects: "when the eye perceives bright light one of four reactions may take place. These are, in order of increasing brightness: dazzle, after image formation, flash blindness, and irreversible damage. [...] Flash blindness occurs when an extremely bright flash is discharged, usually at night, and again vision is temporarily lost." The United States Federal Aviation Administration defines flash blindness in Order JO 7400.2 as "generally, a temporary visual interference effect that persists after the source of the illumination has ceased."

== Potential hazards ==
Because vision loss is sudden and takes time to recover, flash blindness can be hazardous. At some sporting events such as figure skating, fans are cautioned to not use flash photography so as to avoid distracting or disorienting the athletes. Also in aviation, there is concern about laser pointers and bright searchlights causing temporary flash blindness and other vision-distracting effects to pilots who are in critical phases of flight such as approach and landing.

The bright initial flash of a nuclear weapon is the first indication of a nuclear explosion, traveling faster than the blast wave or sound wave. "A 1-megaton explosion can cause flash blindness at distances as great as 13 miles (21 km) on a clear day, or 53 miles (85 km) on a clear night. If the intensity is great enough, a permanent retinal burn (photic retinopathy) will result."

== Pain ==
It is unclear whether pain is directly associated with flash blindness. Reaction to flash blindness can be discomforting and disorienting, but the retina itself has no pain receptors, unlike the cornea. However, psychological pain could potentially occur in response to loss of vision. This can cause amplified stress levels, but such effects usually fade over time.

== Related conditions ==
Welders can get a painful condition called arc eye. While it is caused by bright light similar to flash blindness, the welder's arc lasts for much longer than flash blindness and involves exposure to ultraviolet rays that can damage the cornea. Flash blindness, in contrast, is caused by a single, very brief exposure which oversaturates the retina, and is not usually accompanied by reports of pain.

== See also ==
- Smart glass
