= Scramble for Laccadives =

1948 conflict between Pakistan and India

Laccadives Scramble
Date	February 1948
Location	Laccadives
Status	Indian victory
Territorial changes	Laccadives remains under Madras Province

Belligerents
Union of India: (India) Madras Province; Travancore	Dominion of Pakistan

Commanders and leaders
(India) Vallabhbhai Patel	(Pakistan) Liaquat Ali Khan

Units involved
(India) Travancore Police; Indian Navy	Pakistan Navy

The Scramble of the Laccadives was a military race between Pakistan Navy and Indian authorities in Travancore to reach the islands of Lakshadweep and annex the territory which took place in late August 1947. Both countries deployed naval vessels but the Indian authorities were able to reach the islands which remained under the administration of Madras Province.

== Background ==
The Aminidivi islands, under the rule of Tipu Sultan of Mysore Kingdom in 1787, were annexed to the British Raj in 1799 after the Fourth Anglo-Mysore War. The rest of the islands remained under the suzerainty of the Arakkal family in return for a payment of annual tribute. The British took over the administration of these islands in 1908 for nonpayment of arrears and integrated it with the Madras Presidency. As the Lacccadives were not a separate entity and therefore not considered during the Partition of India, their status was unnclear. As a consequence, Pakistan attempted to take hold of these islands.

== Race for Laccadives ==
At the end of August of 1947, Liaquat Ali Khan came to the realisation that Laccadives, a region with a Muslim-majority population did not become a part of Pakistan and could be taken control of with ease. The deputy prime minister of India, Vallabhbhai Patel, also started to think about Laccadives.

So, the Royal Pakistan Navy sent a naval vessel towards Laccadives from Karachi. In India Vallabhbhai Patel was informed about the plannings in Karachi. He immediately sent collector of Travancore to the Laccadives. He also sent a message to the Mudaliar brothers to convey to the collector of Travancore to order the police officials to go to Lacccadives with available weaponry. Vallabhbhai Patel stated "If the police forces no firearms with them, they can take lathis with them but somehow take possession of the area." and the Flag of India was raised.

A few hours later, the Pakistani warship reached the Laccadives and had to return on seeing the Indian flag flying.

== Aftermath ==
The islands remained under the Madras Province of the Union of India and later became part of the Madras State under the Constitution of India in 1950. In 1956, the islands which were had been divided between the South Canara and Malabar districts of Madras state, was organized into a separate union territory administered by the Government of India, following the States Reorganisation Act. The territory which was known as Laccadive, Minicoy, and Amindivi Islands became Lakshadweep islands on 1 November 1973.
