= Baton charge =

Police tactic for crowd dispersion

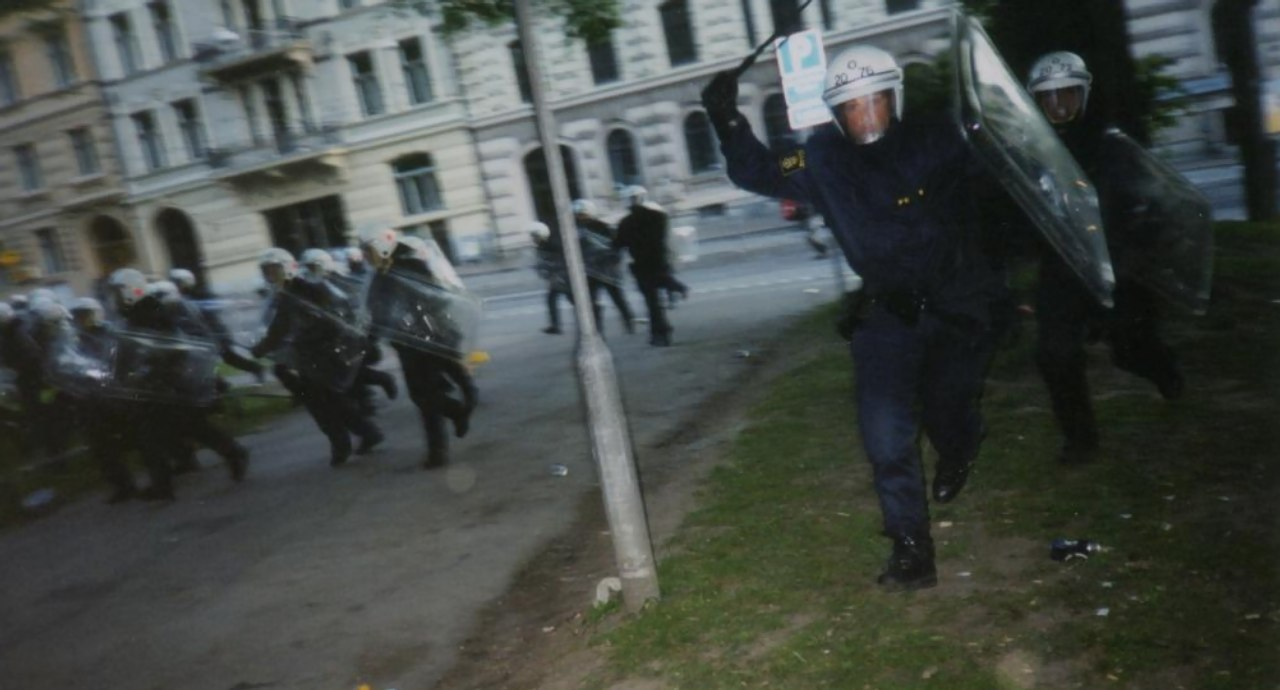
A baton charge during the 2001 EU summit protests in Sweden

A baton charge is a coordinated tactic for dispersing crowds of people, usually used by police, paramilitary or military in response to public disorder. In the Indian subcontinent, a long bamboo stick, called a lathi in Bengali, Hindi, Kannada Nepali and Urdu, is used for crowd control, and the expression lathi charge is commonly employed to describe the action.

The tactic involves police officers charging at a crowd of people with batons and in some cases riot shields. They run at the crowd hitting people with their batons, and in some situations use riot shields to push them away. Baton charging is designed to cause pain or fear of pain, in the hope that crowds would be compelled to move away from the scene, dispersing them.

== Indian subcontinent ==
In the Indian subcontinent, notably India, Nepal, Bangladesh, Pakistan, and Sri Lanka, a long bamboo stick, or staff, called lathi, is used for crowd control. The term lathi charge is used by the Indian and Pakistani media.

== See also ==
- Riot control
- Snatch squad
- Protesting
- Police brutality
