= Riot control =

Measures taken against unlawful or violent crowds of people

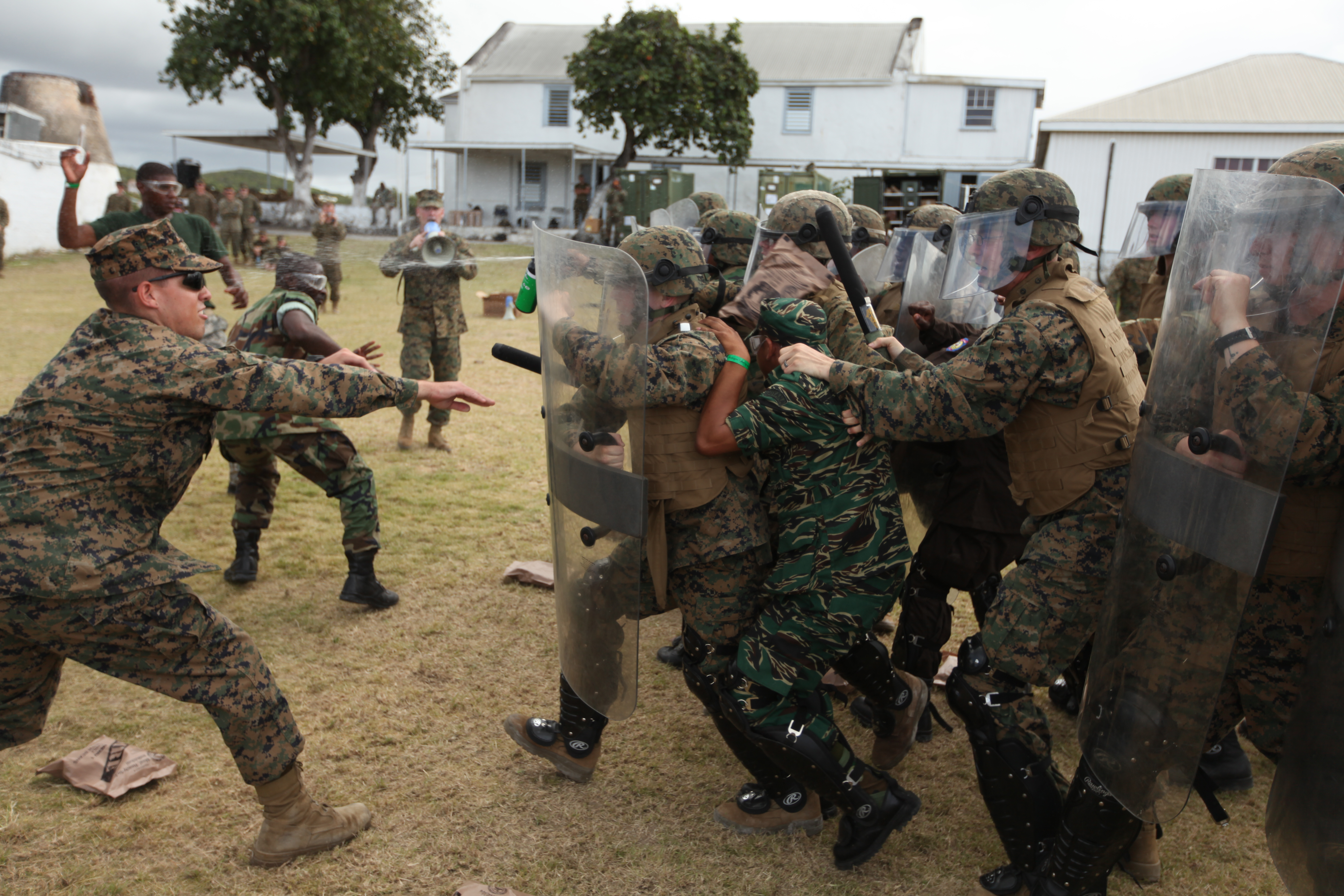
American marines and Caribbean soldiers clashing during a riot control training exercise in 2011

Riot control is a form of public order policing used by law enforcement, military, paramilitary or security forces to control, disperse, or arrest people who are involved in a riot, demonstration or protest.

If a riot is spontaneous, then actions which cause people to stop and think (e.g. loud noises or issuing instructions in a calm tone) can be enough to stop it. However, these methods usually fail when there is severe anger, or the riot was planned or organized. Riot control personnel have long used less lethal weapons such as batons and whips to disperse crowds and detain rioters. Since the 1980s, riot control officers have also used tear gas, pepper spray, rubber bullets, stun grenades, and electric tasers. In some cases, riot squads may also use Long Range Acoustic Devices, water cannons, armoured fighting vehicles, aerial surveillance, police dogs or mounted police on horses. Persons performing riot control typically wear protective equipment such as riot helmets, face visors, body armor (vests, neck protectors, knee pads, etc.), gas masks and riot shields. Even though riot tactics are effective in controlling crowds, they can also lead to significant psychological effects on both the rioters and the police. Exposure to intense fear, stress, and violence during these confrontations can result in long-term mental health issues, like anxiety, post-traumatic stress disorder (PTSD), and heightened aggression, which can impact the well-being of protesters and police officers.

There have been cases where lethal weapons are used to violently suppress a protest or riot, as in the Nika Riots in the Roman Empire, The Boston Massacre, The Haymarket Massacre, Bloody Sunday (1905), Banana Massacre, Río Piedras massacre, Ponce massacre, Hungarian Revolution of 1956, Sharpeville massacre, Kent State Shootings, Bloody Sunday (1972), Soweto Uprising, Mendiola Massacre, Tbilisi Massacre, 1989 Tiananmen Square protests, 2017 Venezuelan protests, 2018–2019 Gaza border protests, 2022 Sri Lankan protests, 2022 Kazakh unrest, Mahsa Amini protests and 2025–2026 Iranian protests.

== History ==
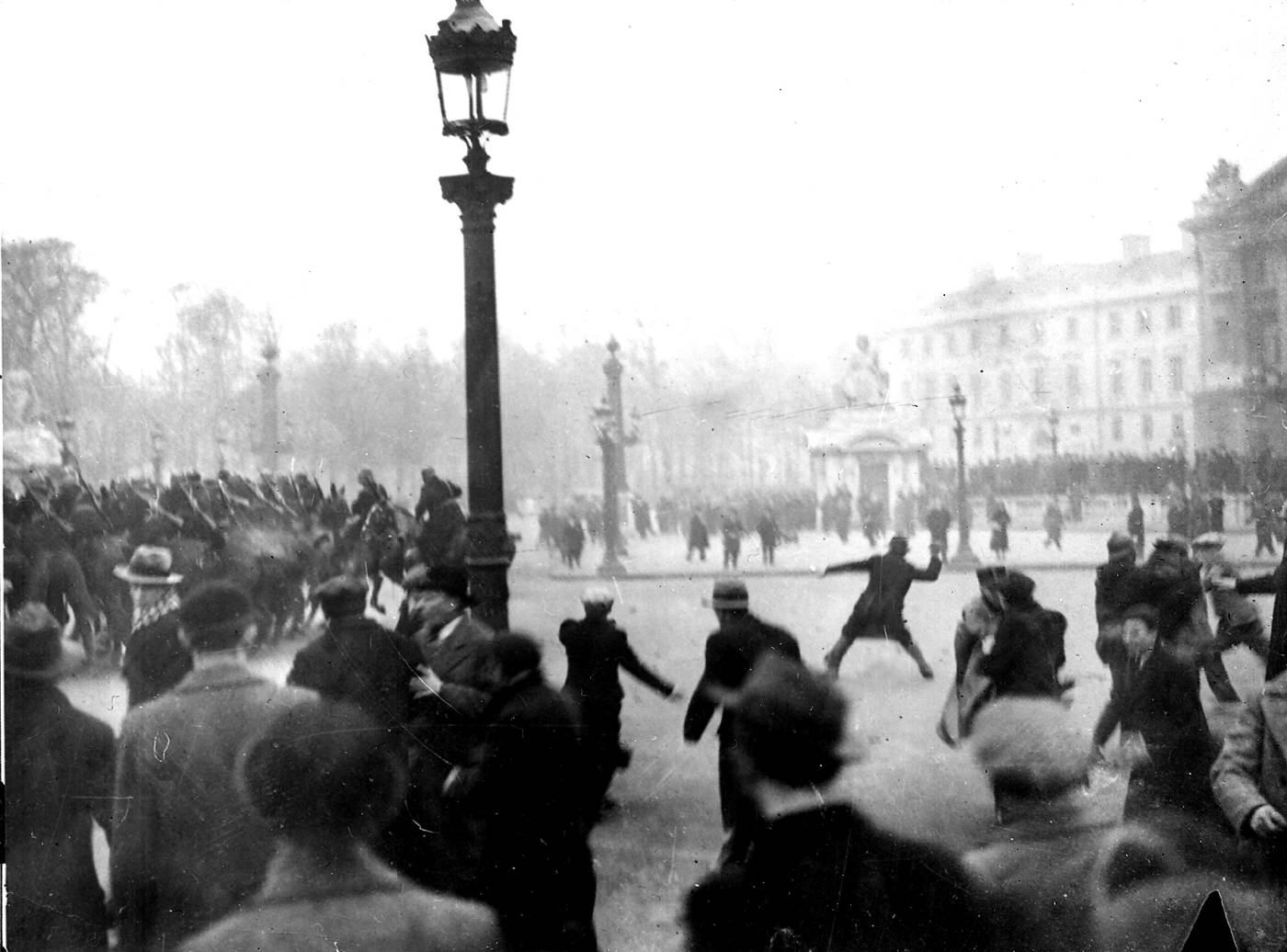
GRM horse platoon and rioteers Paris - Place de la Concorde - 1934

Maintaining order during demonstrations and quenching riots has always been a challenge for governments and administrations. Until early in the 20th century, no dedicated force really existed in most countries and the traditional response when the regular police force proved inadequate was to call upon the army, often with disastrous results: either fraternization or use of excessive violence.

The terminology arguably first arises in the Keystone Cops short "A Hash House Fraud" in 1915.

In France, for example, several revolts were fueled by poor handling by the military. The National Gendarmerie created specialized "mobile" gendarmerie forces several times during the 19th century in times of trouble but these units were disbanded soon after the end of the troubles they had been tasked to handle and there was no permanent organization in place until it was finally decided in 1921 to create "Mobile Gendarmerie platoons" within the Departmental Gendarmerie. These platoons, either horse mounted or on foot were composed of 40 gendarmes each (60 in the Paris Region). In 1926, the platoons formed the "Garde Républicaine mobile" (mobile republican guard or GRM), which became a distinct branch of the Gendarmerie in 1927, the platoons becoming part of companies and legions. By 1940, the GRM was a force 21,000 strong, composed of 14 Légions, 54 company groups and 167 companies.

Long the only large force specialized in maintaining or restoring law and order in France during demonstrations or riots, the GRM progressively developed the doctrine and skills needed in that role: exercise restraint, avoid confrontation as long as possible, always leave an "exit door" for the crowd, etc. In 1940, after the fall of France, the German authorities had the GRM disbanded but it was reinstated in 1944 and renamed Mobile Gendarmerie in 1954.

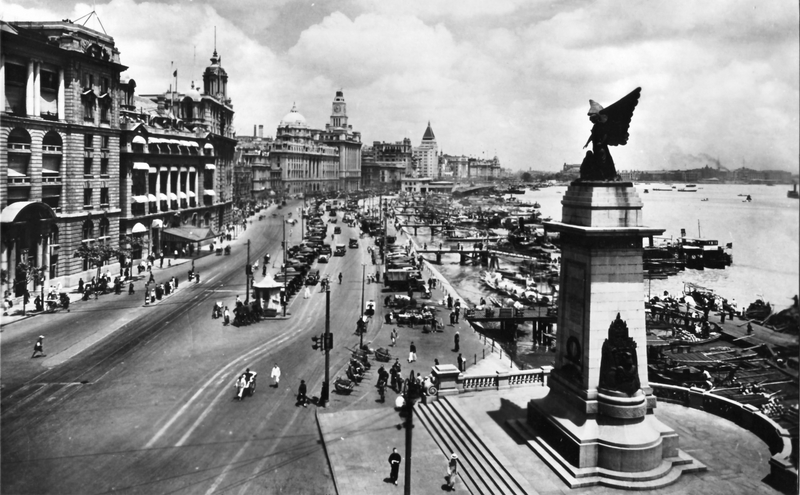
The centre of the International Settlement of Shanghai, 1928.

The first squad trained in modern techniques of riot control in Asia was formed in 1925 in colonial Shanghai as a response to the mismanaged riot of the May Thirtieth Movement.

New policing methods, including combat pistol shooting, hand to hand combat skills, and knife fight training, were pioneered by British Assistant Commissioner William E. Fairbairn and officer Eric Anthony Sykes of the Shanghai Municipal Police as a response to a staggering rise in armed crime in the 1920s — Shanghai had become one of the world's most dangerous cities due to a breakdown in law and order in the country and the growth of organised crime and the opium trade.

Under Fairbairn, the SMP developed a myriad of riot control measures. These riot control techniques led to the introduction of Shanghai's "Reserve Unit", used to forcibly disband riots and respond to high-level crimes such as kidnappings and armed robberies. The skills developed in Shanghai have been adopted and adapted by both international police forces and clandestine warfare units. Fairbairn was again the central figure, not only leading the Reserve Unit, but teaching his methods around the world, including in the United States, and colonial Cyprus and the Straits Settlements.

== Modern examples ==
=== Black Lives Matter protests ===
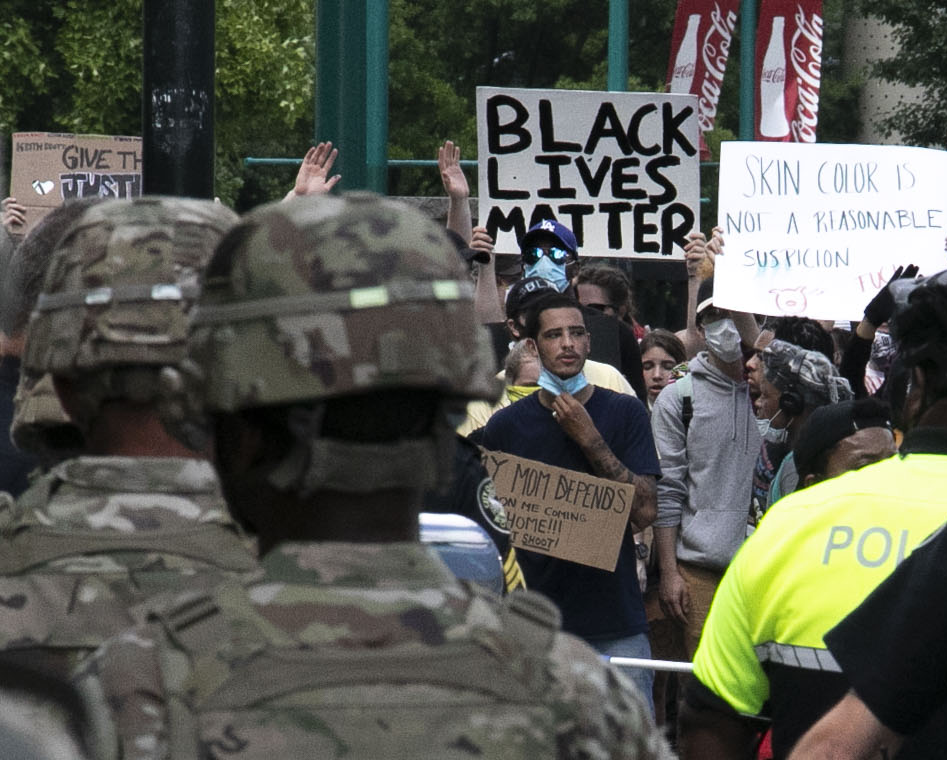

George Floyd was an African-American man who was murdered by a Minneapolis Police Officer on 25 May 2020 during an arrest. Subsequently, many Americans protested for Black Lives Matter. The summer of 2020 oversaw a large number of mass protests for Black Lives Matter to address systemic bias in police departments. Due to the high volume of protests, police departments and sparsely the National Guard were sent to control or end the long protests. Police departments often wore riot gear and used both projectiles and irritants to disperse or contain the protesters. These incidents were widely documented through the use of social media. Documentation and support for the protests further facilitated the movement. One study, recorded by the National Institute of Health, studied the usage of social media as well as its contributions to the movement's legitimacy. Counter-protesters as well as militias responded with violence against the protesters in addition to police departments. Instead of irritants or other standardized tools for riot control, these counter-protesters often used more violent techniques such as ramming into protesters with their cars. Data supports that Black Lives Matter protests in particular were faced with much more state intervention. Suppression techniques that were used by both the state and right wing counter-protesters resulted in injury and death. Both during and after the protests, there were many pieces of legislation that either were passed or were written to curb these protests. Law makers and members of the public questioned riot control and its violations of the First Amendment including the right to assembly and the right to free speech. 45 U.S. states had considered this legislation. Concerns were raised by both political parties on the distinction between riots and protests.

=== Peru protests ===
Between 2022 and 2023, several protests in Peru erupted who were against the Congress and President Dina Bolurate. In December of 2022, the government suspended several constitutional rights. These included the right to prevent troops from entering and staying in one's home, the freedom of movement, and the freedom of assembly. The force used against the protesters resulted in at least six hundred injuries and sixty deaths. Spain had traditionally funded the government in past years and continued to do so to provide weaponry and funding to dismantle these protests. The NGO Amnesty International called on Spain to discontinue these exports citing it as "lethal repression." The security forces came in with assault weapons and in one incident opened fire on protesters. Amnesty International interpreted that the President should be held criminally responsible for the deaths and injuries that the protesters had sustained.

== Equipment ==
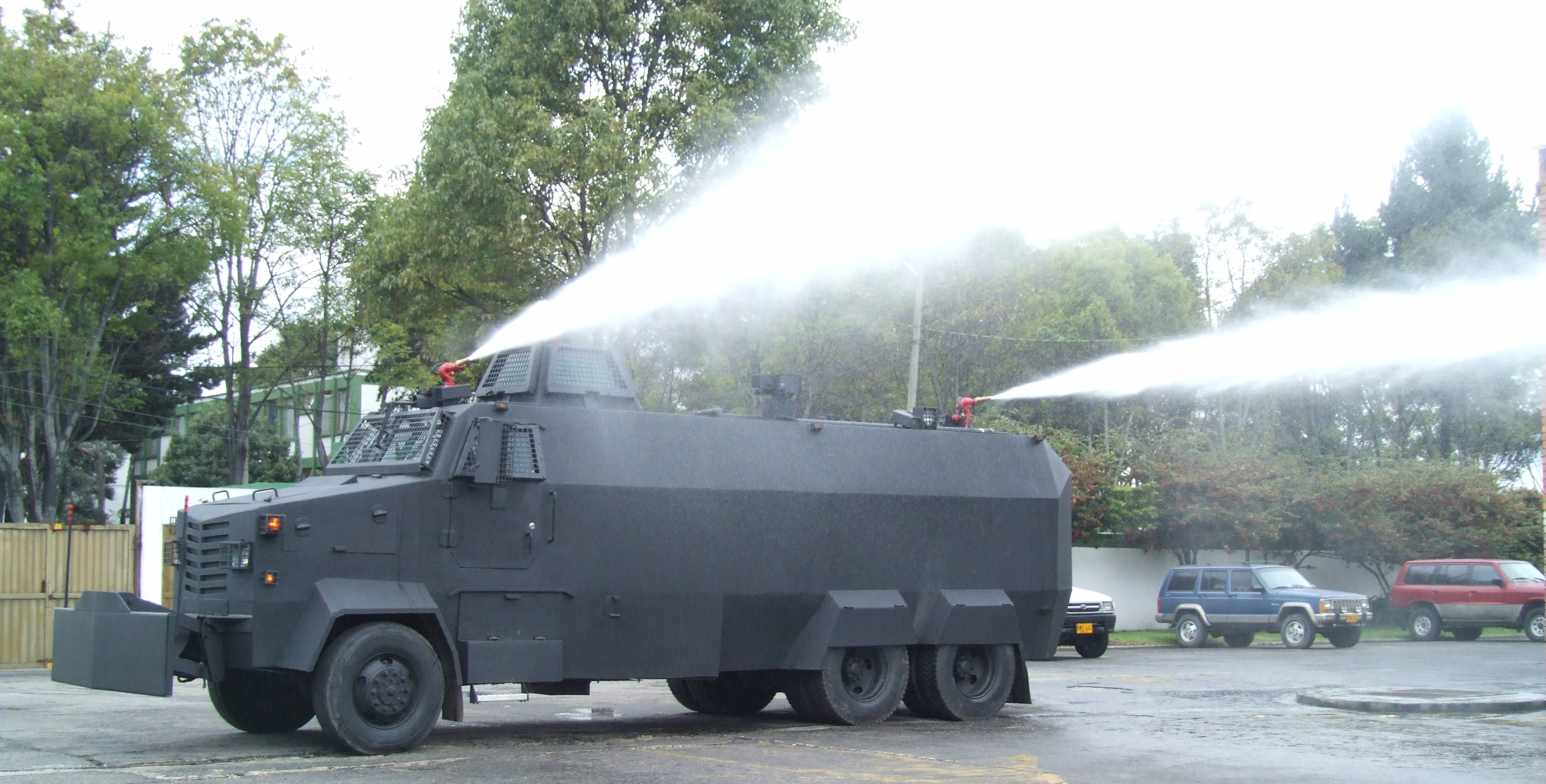
Colombian Police armored riot control vehicle with water cannon ISBI

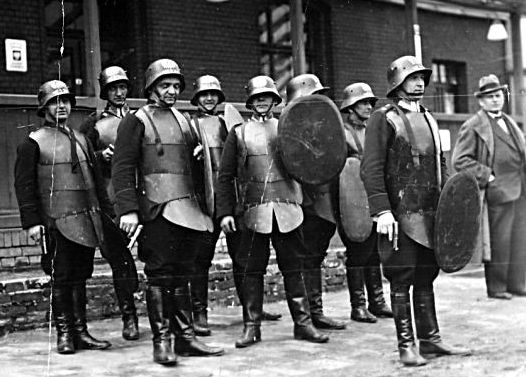
Polish riot police squad in the 1930s, with opaque riot shields and no helmet visors, as polycarbonate had not been invented yet

For protection, officers that are trained in police anti-riot schools performing riot control will often wear protective helmets and carry riot shields. These are designed to protect the wearer from those dangers that come from direct melee and hurled objects such as bottles and bricks. The gear frequently worn by riot control officers protects the entire body with no vulnerable spots to exploit. For example, the helmets worn by riot control officers have an additional outward-extending part that protects the back of the neck from assault. To provide even greater protection, the protective equipment often provides ballistic protection. If tear gas or other riot control agents are to be used, gas masks may also be worn. While the visual of police in full riot gear may be intimidating, today's riot suits are designed to minimize injuries and prevent fatalities for both officers and citizens. This evolution of riot gear signifies a move towards less-than-lethal tactics and de-escalation approaches. Contemporary riot gear incorporated innovations such as tear gas, rubber bullets, batons, pepper spray, and tasers, which contributes to minimizing injuries and casualties for all parties involved. These advancements have revolutionized crowd control by shifting from relying on lethal force to employing more less-than-lethal methods that prioritize public safety and safeguard the well-being of law enforcement officers.

One of many additional concerns is to prevent people in the crowd from taking officers' side arms, which may be stolen or even used against the police. In a very heavy crowd, the officer may not be able to see who is responsible for taking a weapon, and may not even notice that it has happened. For this reason, riot police may have holsters with positive locking mechanisms or other extra means of retention, if their agencies can afford such tools. However, this can be a trade-off that increases the amount of time needed to draw the sidearm in an emergency. Alternatively, riot police may not carry sidearms at all.

The initial choice of tactics determines the type of offensive equipment used. The base choice is between lethal (e.g. 12 gauge shotgun) and less-than-lethal weaponry (e.g. tear gas, pepper spray, plastic bullets, tasers, batons, and other incapacitants). The decision is based on the perceived level of threat and the existing laws; in many countries it is illegal to use lethal force to control riots in all but the most extreme circumstances.

Special riot hand weapons include the wooden or rubber baton; the African sjambok, a heavy leather or plastic whip, and the Indian lathi, a 6 to 8 foot (1.8 to 2.4 m) long cane with a blunt metal tip. Vehicle-mounted water cannons may serve to augment personal weapons. Some water cannons let police add dye to mark rioters or tear gas to help disperse the crowds.

In major unrest, police in armoured vehicles may be sent in following an initial subduing with firepower. Occasionally, police dogs, fire hoses, or mounted police are deployed.

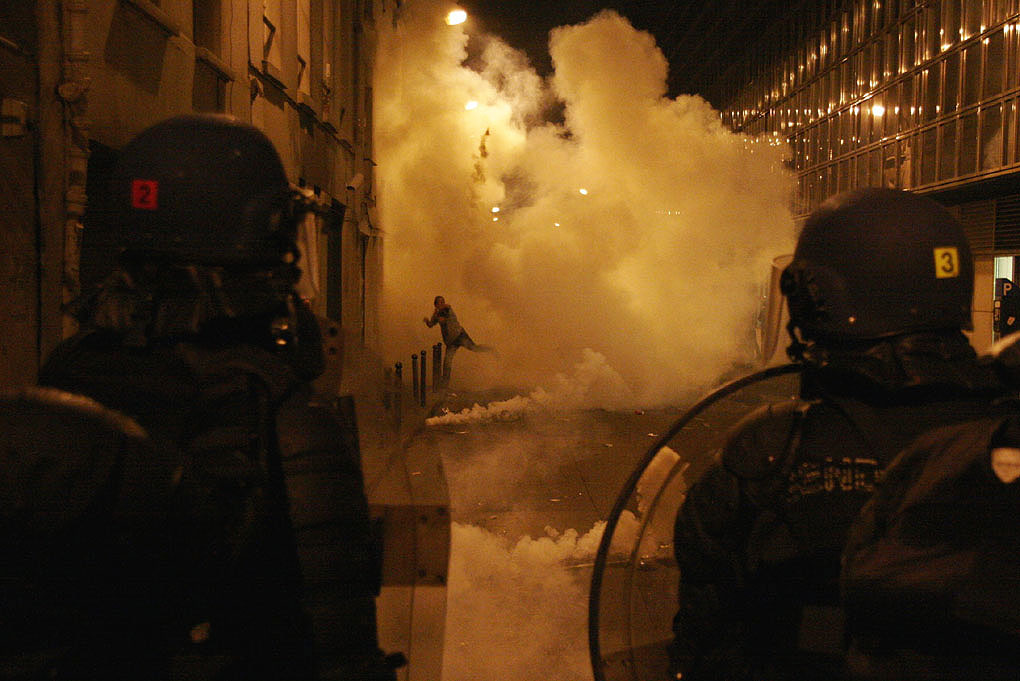
French gendarmes mobiles using tear gas

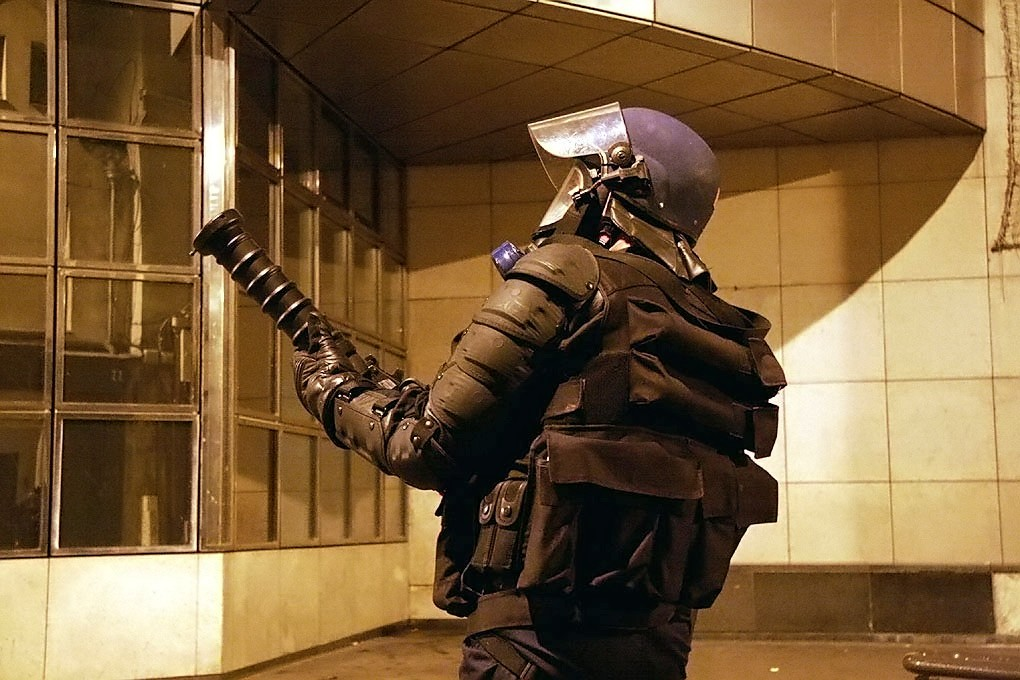
This gendarme is shooting tear gas canisters using an Alsetex "Cougar" launcher

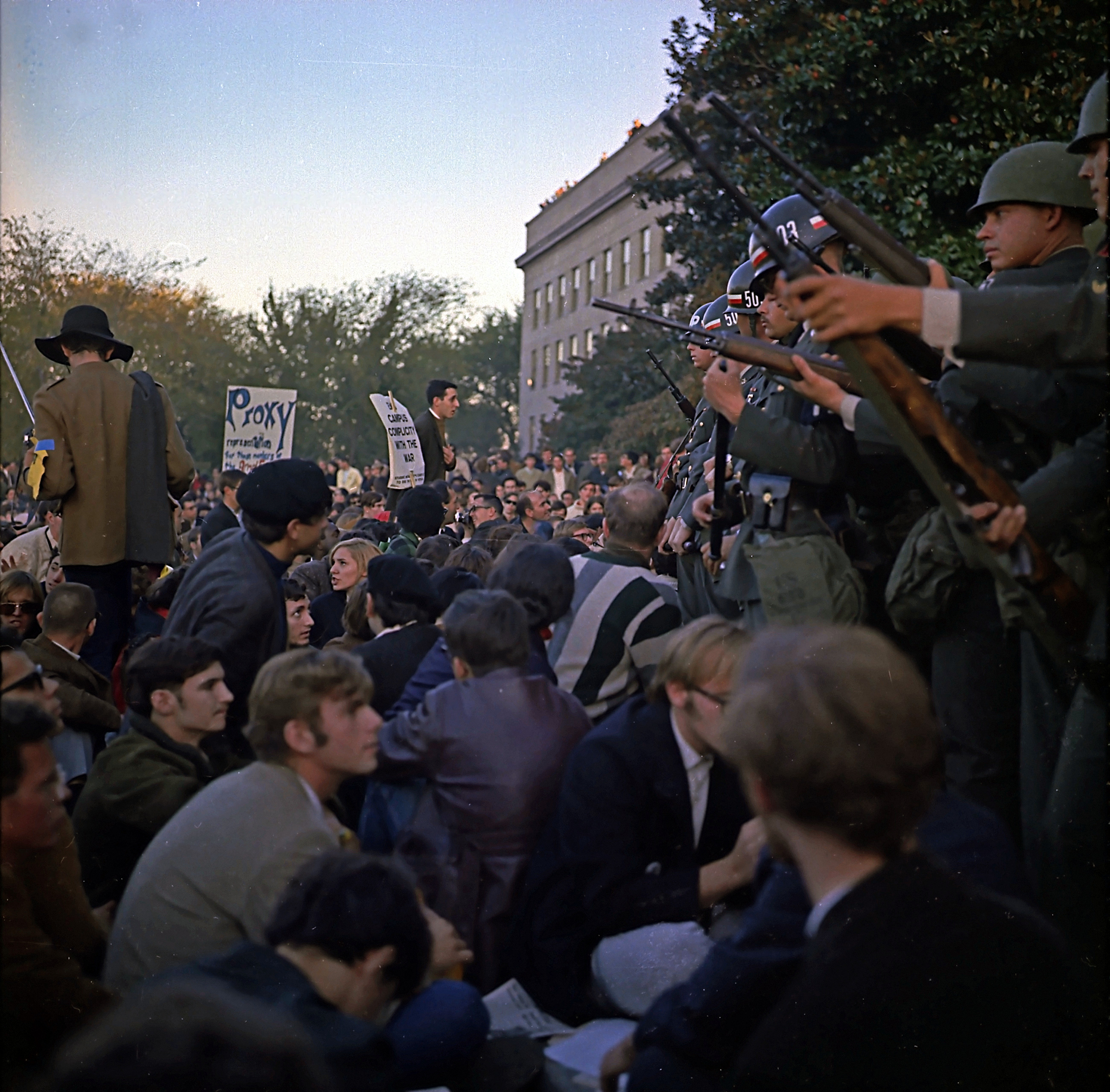
U.S. Army troops attempting to keep Vietnam War protesters from rioting in Washington, D.C., 1967.

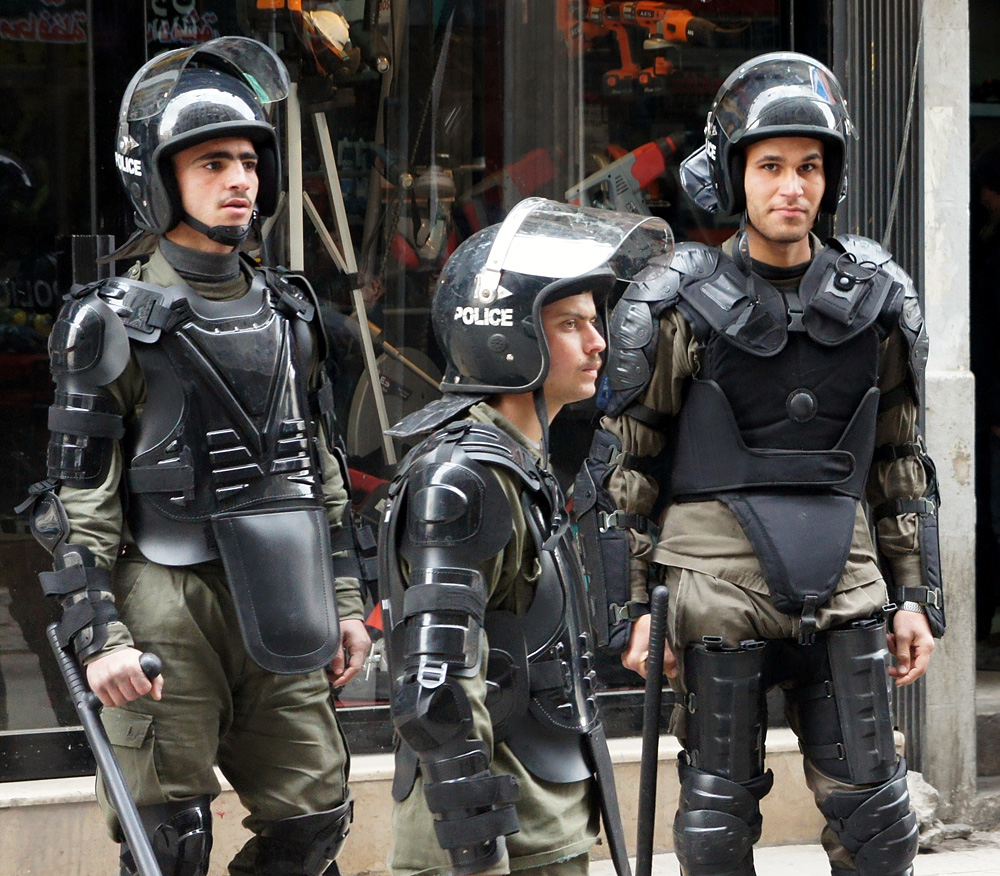
Syrian riot control in Damascus in 2012

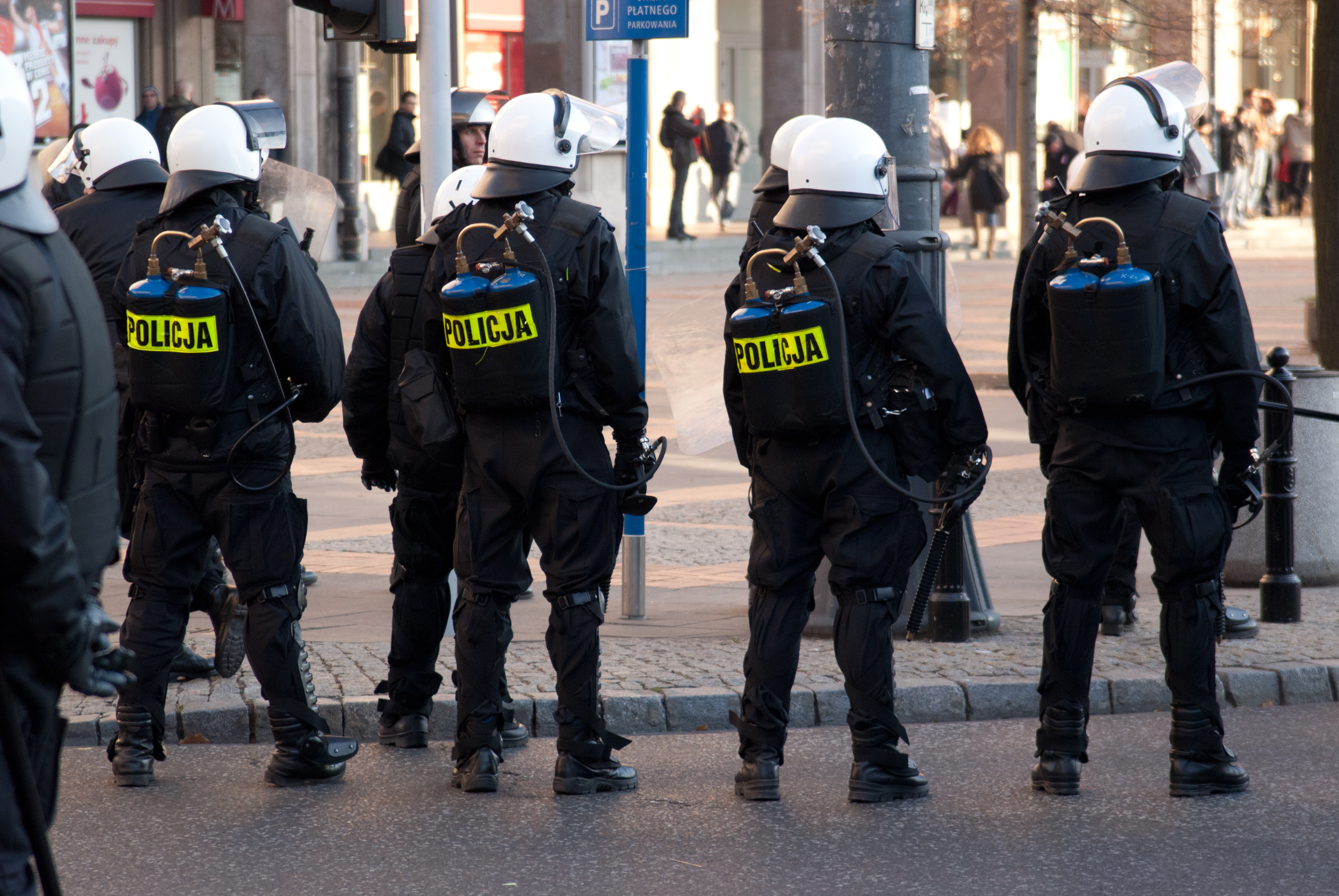
Polish riot control police in Warsaw at the March of Independence in 2011

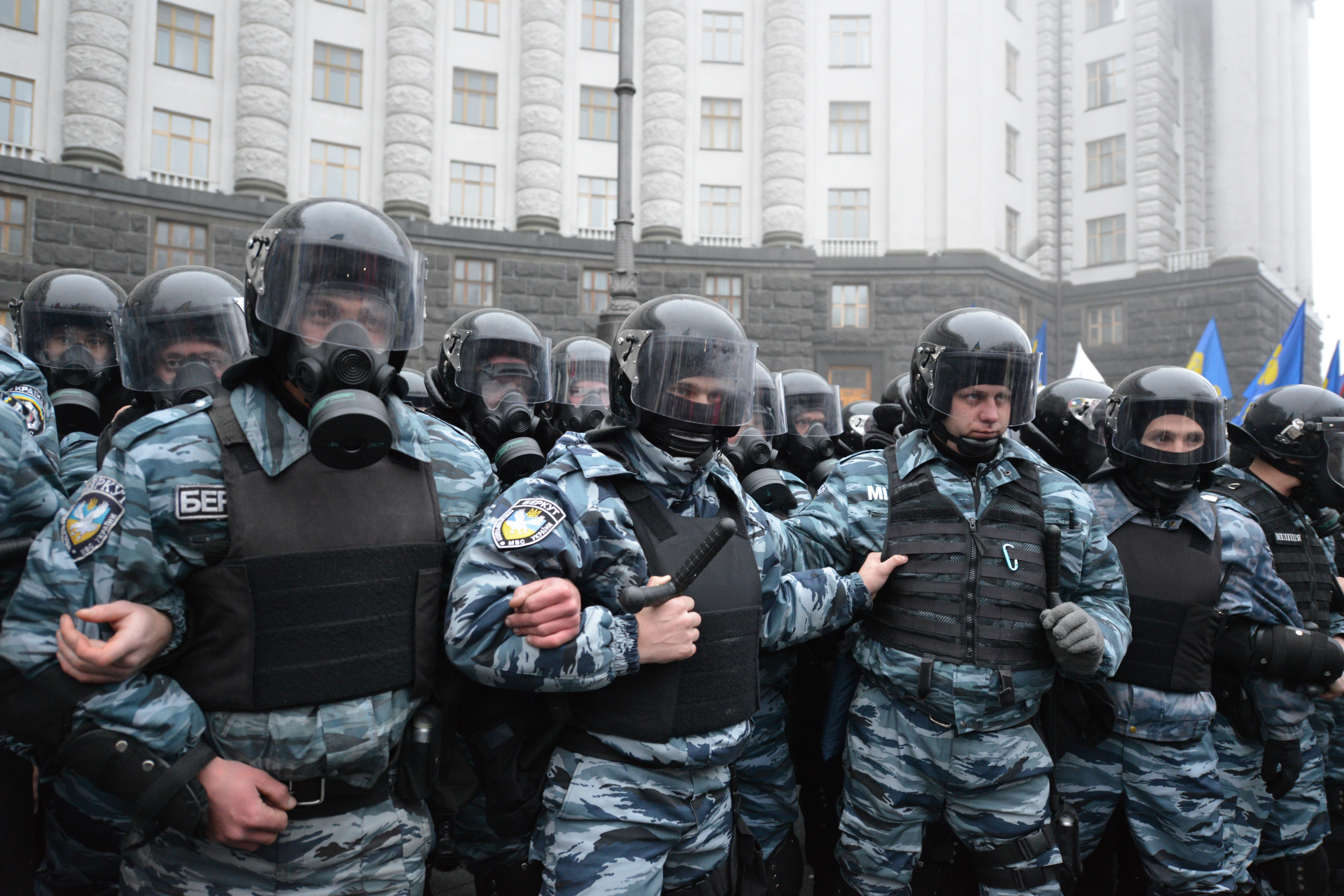
Defensive line of "Berkut" unitmen in riot gear by the Cabinet of Ministers building in Kyiv during 2013 Euromaidan protests.

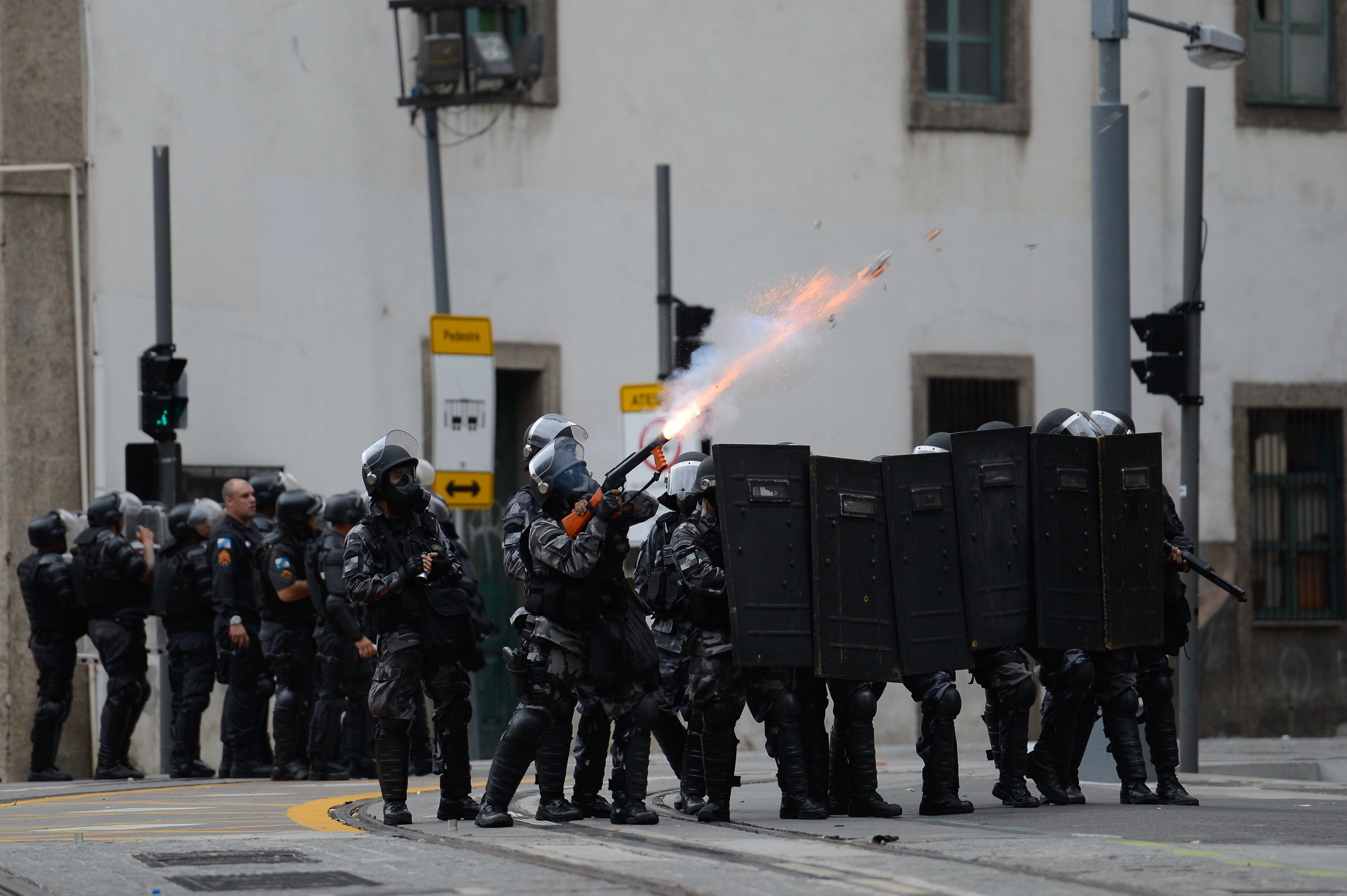
Riot control group of Rio de Janeiro Police in confrontation with protesters in the historical center of the city.

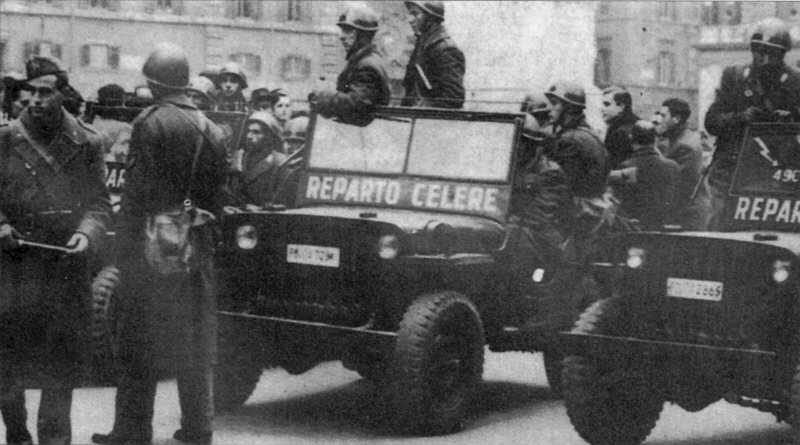
Italian Celerini in the 1950s.

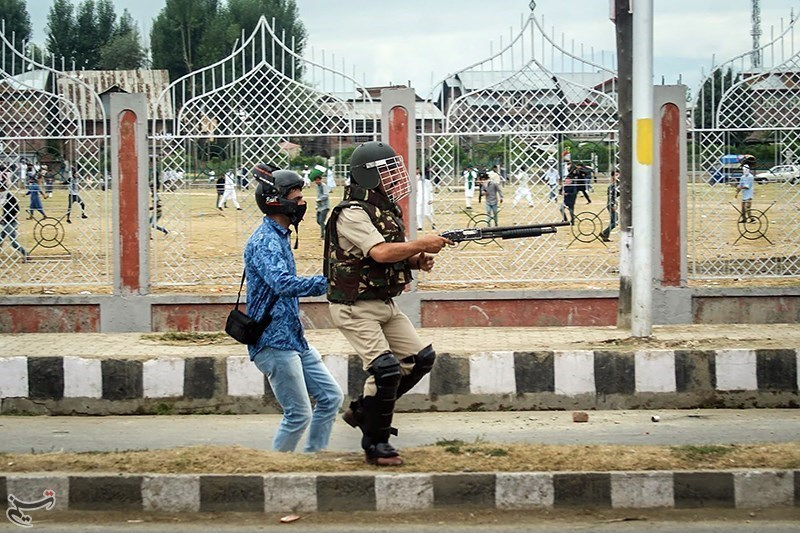
Pellet shotguns have been used by Indian security forces for crowd control in Jammu and Kashmir against stone pelting mobs.

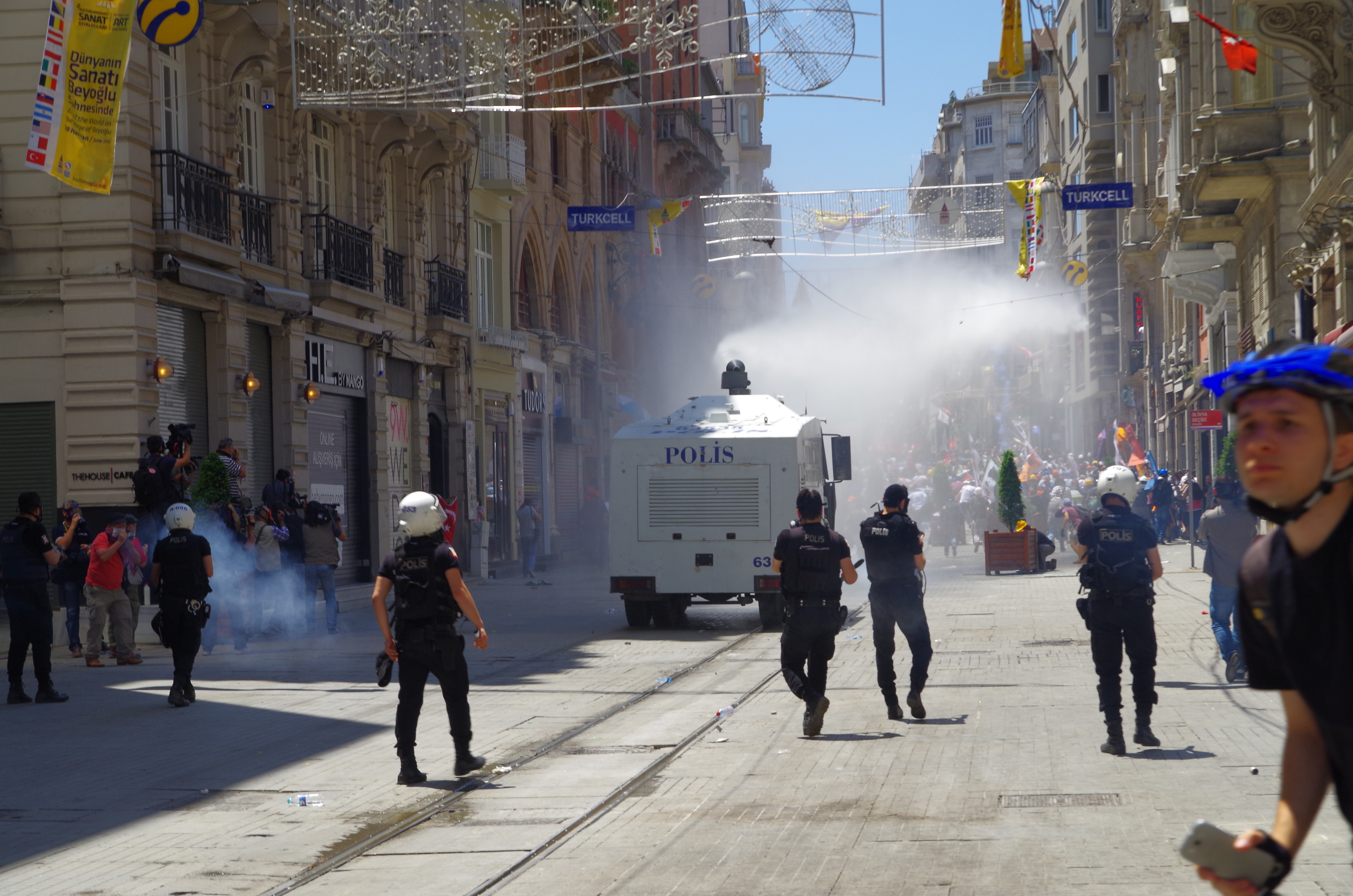
Intervention vehicle for social events that interfered with demonstrators in Gezi Park (Istanbul) in 2013

== Riot control agents (RCA) ==
Riot control agents (sometimes called RCAs) are non-lethal lachrymatory agents used for riot control. Most commonly used riot control agents are pepper spray and various kinds of tear gas. These chemicals enable to disperse a protesting or rioting crowd, or to clear a building. They can rapidly produce sensory irritation or disabling physical effects which usually disappear within 15 minutes (for tear gas) and up to 2 hours (for pepper spray) following termination of exposure. They can also be used for chemical warfare defense training, but their use in warfare itself is a violation of Article I.5 of the Chemical Weapons Convention. Article II.9 of the CWC specifically authorizes their use for domestic law enforcement.

=== Pepper spray ===
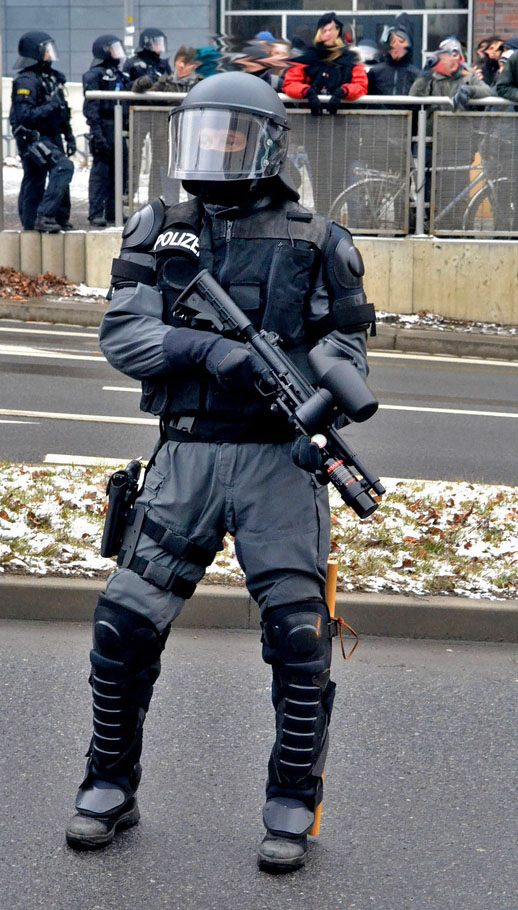
A German SEK operator in riot gear holding a Tac700 Pepperball Launcher

The active ingredient in pepper-spray is capsaicin, which is a chemical derived from the fruit of plants in the Capsicum genus, including chilies. Desmethyldihydrocapsaicin, a synthetic analogue of capsaicin also known as pelargonic acid vanillylamide or PAVA, is used in another version of pepper spray known as PAVA spray and used in the United Kingdom. Another synthetic counterpart of pepper spray, pelargonic acid morpholide, was developed and is widely used in Russia. Its effectiveness compared to natural pepper spray is uncertain and it reportedly has caused some injuries. When undesirables threaten an area, such as a riot after a soccer game, riot police are called in to subdue them. In these situations, the police may use pepper spray, or water cannons to neutralize the threat.

Pepper spray typically comes in canisters, which are often small enough to be carried or concealed in a pocket or purse. Pepper spray can also be bought concealed in items such as rings. There are also pepper spray projectiles available, which can be fired from a paintball gun. Having been used for years against demonstrators, it is increasingly being used by police in routine interventions.

=== Tear gas ===
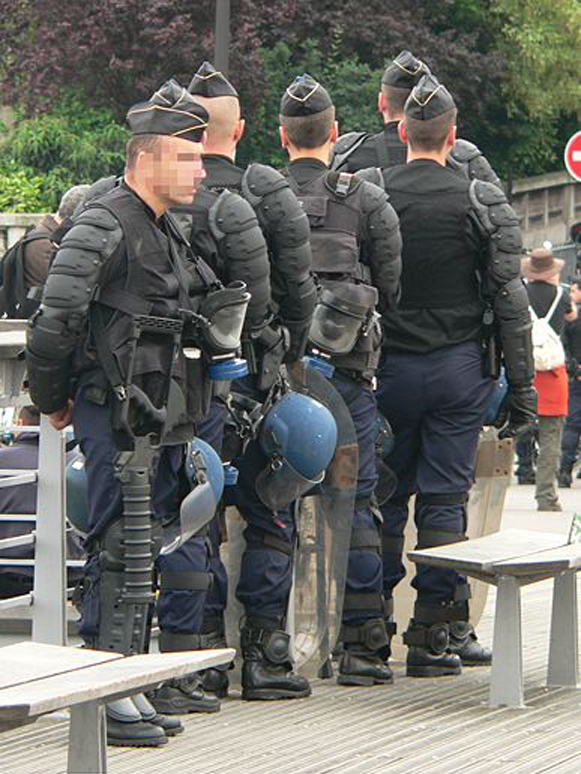
Gendarmes mobiles carrying gas masks and a grenade launcher for deploying tear gas canisters

Tear gas is a non-specific term for any chemical that is used to temporarily incapacitate through irritation of eyes and/or respiratory system. It is used as a hand-held spray or can be fired in canisters that heat up spewing out an aerosol cloud at a steady rate.

While the use of tear gas in warfare is prohibited by various international treaties (Note: e.g. the Geneva Protocol of 1925: 'Prohibited the use of "asphyxiating gas, or any other kind of gas, liquids, substances or similar materials"') that most countries have signed, use by police and for private self-defense is not banned by these treaties.

Popular tear gases include the eye irritants ortho-chlorobenzylidene-malononitrile (CS gas), chloroacetophenone (CN gas), and dibenz (b,f)-1,4-oxazepine (CR gas). Among a long list of substances, these three have become of greater importance than the others because of their effectiveness and low risks when used. Today, CS has largely replaced CN as the most widely used tear gas internationally.

==== Decontamination ====
At room temperature, tear gases are white solids. They are stable when heated and have low vapor pressure. Consequently, they are usually dispersed as aerosols. All of them have low solubility in water but can be dissolved in several organic solvents. Hydrolysis of CN is very slow in a water solution, especially if alkali is added. CS is rapidly hydrolyzed in water solution (half-life at pH 7 is about 15 min. at room temperature) and extremely rapid when alkali is added (half-life at pH 9 is about 1 min.). CR is hydrolyzed only to a negligible extent in water solution.

CN and CR are, thus, difficult to decompose under practical conditions, whereas CS can easily be inactivated by means of a water solution. Skin is suitably decontaminated of CS and CN gas by thorough washing with soap and water. CS is then decomposed, whereas CN is only removed via soap and water. The effects of CR gas are greatly increased by water, causing any attempt to decontaminate CR via soap and water to increase the severity and duration of the effects. When decontamination of CR is attempted with soap and water the effects of CR can last up to 48 hours

Decontamination of material after contamination with CR gas is not possible for up to 45 days. CS can be decontaminated l with a 5–10 percent soda solution or 2 percent alkaline solution. If this type of decontamination cannot be accomplished (e.g., contaminated rooms and furniture), then the only other means is by intensive air exchange—preferably with hot air. Exposed streets and sidewalks will have toxic and irritating CS powder that will be stirred into the air by traffic and pedestrians long after the cloud has dissipated, and should be washed away with water. In contrast to human beings, domesticated animals generally have lower sensitivity to tear gases. Dogs and horses can therefore be used by police for riot control even when tear gas is used.

==== Dispensing large quantities ====
Backpack dispensers for riot control agents, when the intent is to use a larger quantity than possible with grenades, are one type of device used by organizations that might, for example, need to cover a prison yard. Dispensers are also made for attachment to helicopters; see CBU-19.

== Tactics ==
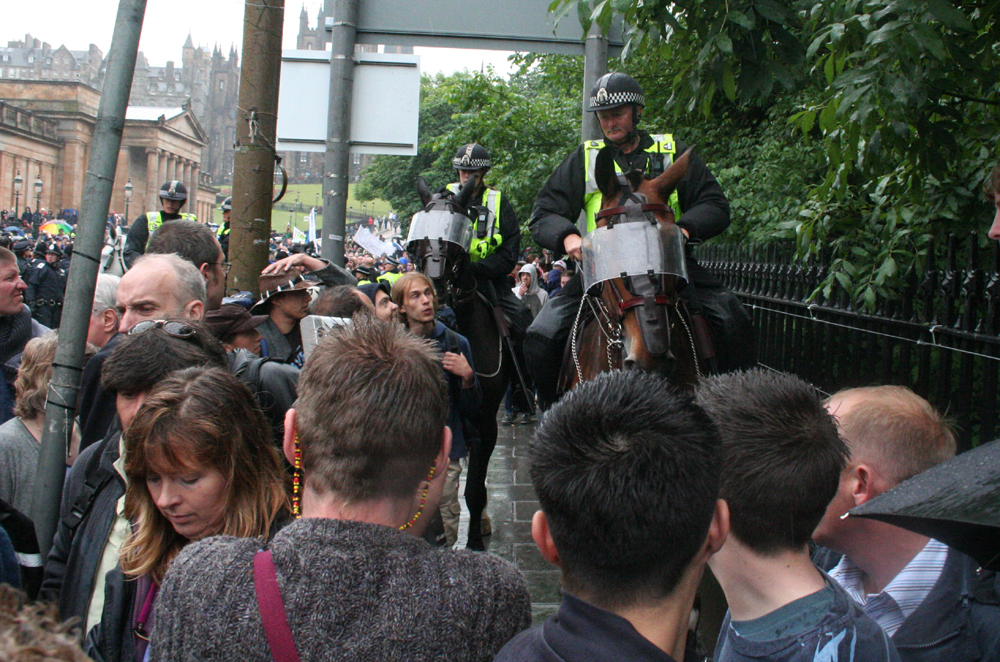
Mounted riot police as crowd control during protests in Edinburgh

The front-line officers in a riot control are often fully armored and carry weapons such as batons, designed to be in direct contact with the crowd. These officers subdue rioters and subsequently allow the less heavily armoured, more mobile officers to make arrests where it is deemed necessary. In face of a greater threat, the riot police will be backed up with other officers equipped with riot guns to fire tear gas, rubber bullets, plastic bullets or "beanbag" rounds.

As a less aggressive step, mounted police may first be sent into the crowd. The might and height offered by the horse are combined with its training, allowing an officer to more safely infiltrate a crowd. Usually, when front-facing a riot, officers slowly walk in a line parallel to the riot's front, extending to both its ends, as they noisily and simultaneously march and beat their shields with their batons, to cause fear and psychological effects on the crowd.

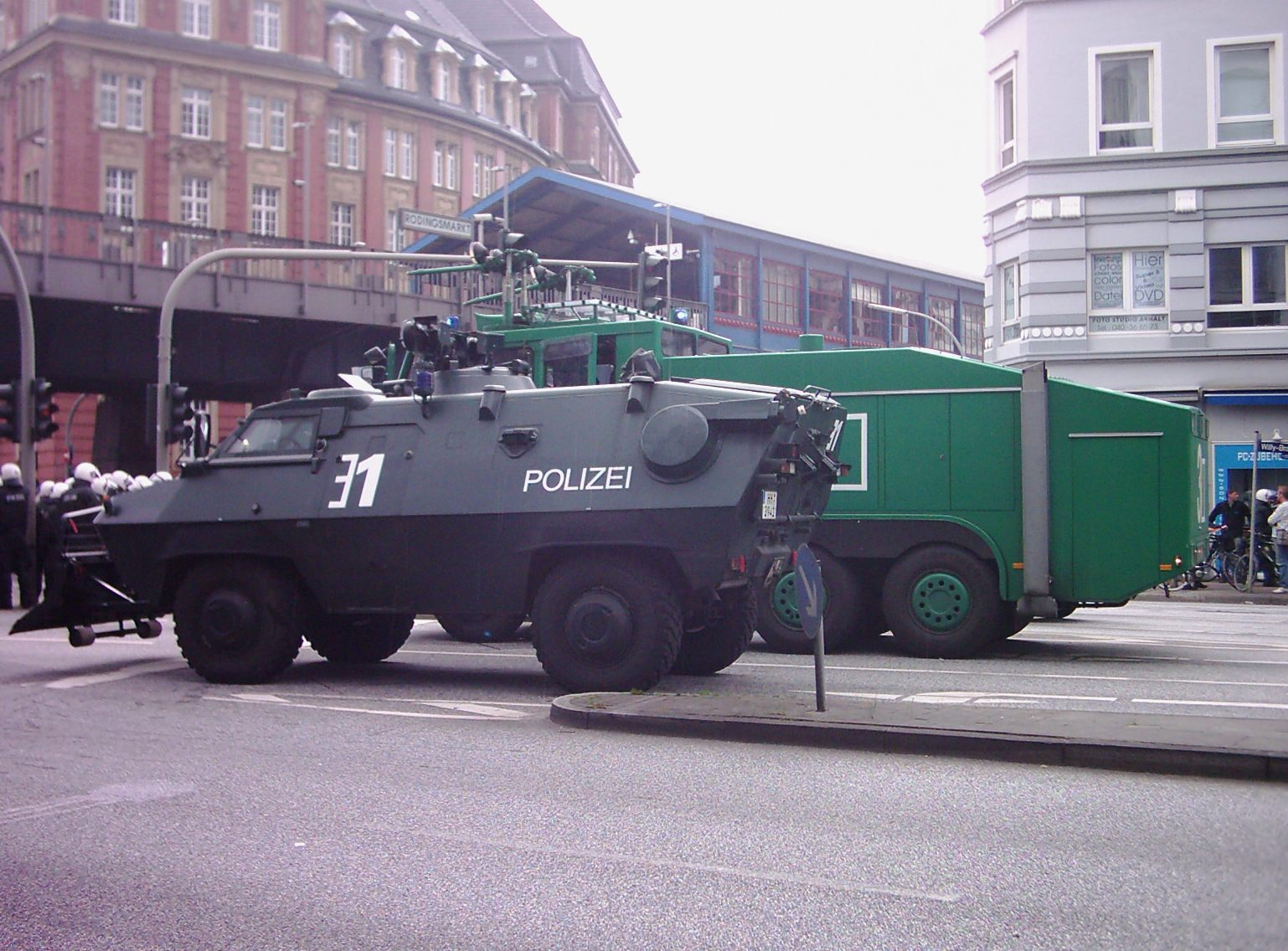
German police deploy an armoured riot control vehicle at a demonstration in Hamburg.

In the United Kingdom, usually when large demonstrations take place that are deemed unstable, the territorial police force responsible for the demonstration in that area will usually deploy Police Support Unit personnel who are trained in riot tactics, along with normal divisional officers. If the demonstration turns violent, police will seal roads and other exits to contain protesters in a single area (known as kettling) to prevent widespread damage and wait until the protesters tire. These tactics were seen during the 2009 G-20 London summit protests and the 2010 student protests in London. Tear gas and other more offensive tactics are used as a last resort. Throughout police will be videoing or photographing protesters for future arrests, "snatch squad" tactics might also be used where several police officers, usually in protective riot gear, rush forwards, occasionally in flying wedge formation to break through the front of a crowd, with the objective of snatching one or more individuals from a riot that are attempting to control the demonstration at which they are present; the target may be a leader or a speaker, or someone who seems to be leading the crowd. This tactic was used in the 2011 England Riots, most notably by Greater Manchester Police who deployed this tactic in Manchester city centre on 9 August 2011.

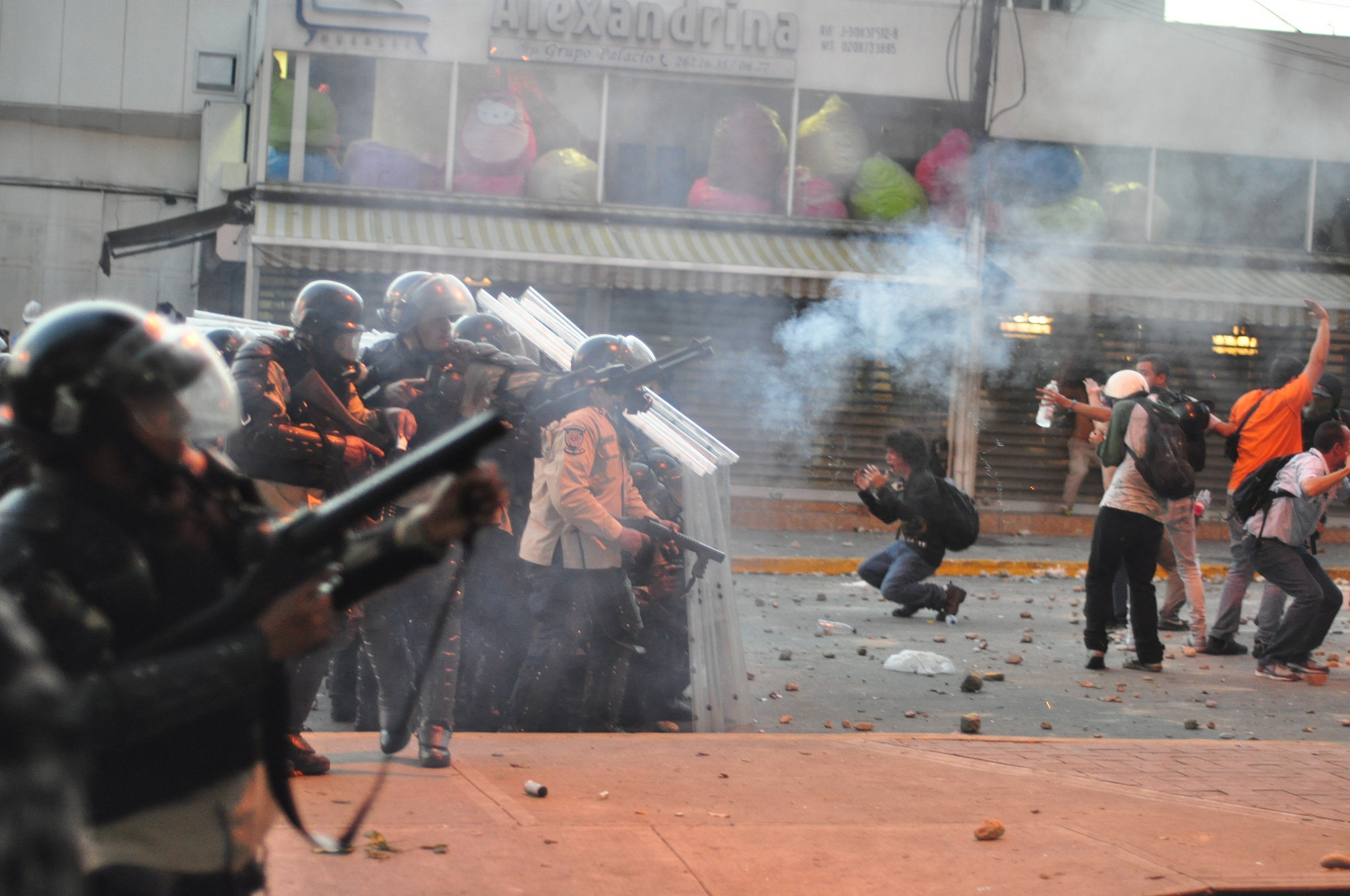
Tear gas used on students in Altamira, Caracas.

A more straightforward tactic police may use is a baton charge which involves police officers charging at a crowd of people with batons and in some cases, riot shields. They run at the crowd hitting people with their batons, and in some situations use riot shields to push them away. Baton charging is designed to cause the maximum amount of pain, in the hope that they would be compelled to move away from the scene, dispersing the crowd.

== Consequences ==
There has been public controversy when it has come to the tactics of riot control. Moral and legal questions have emerged regarding constitutional rights such as the right to assembly as well as free speech. This form of state violence is also controversial as discussions have emerged regarding the legitimacy as well as the ethics of containing protests. There are discussions on the implications of the perceived military-civilian split. For example, the United States regards its police as civilians. However, the ambiguity of the laws allows for the police to act as military in conflicts with U.S. citizens which has typically been seen as legitimate or at least legal.

There are also legitimate health and safety concerns. Some effects of riot agents include irritation, runny nose, chest tightness, coughing as well as swelling. Long term effects include blindness and respiratory failure. Death can also occur instantly due to chemical burns and respiratory failure. Different countries use different methods of riot control. Chloroacetophenone, chlorobenzylidene malononitrile (tear gas) and dibenzoxazepine are common ingredients for riot control. These are highly toxic and cancerous. Countries often have different standards for usage of chemicals like capsaicin (pepper spray) and who is allowed to own and use these chemicals for self-defense. Some scholars have called for natural alternatives to limit long term health effects like those found in the Capsicum genus and the Zingiber genus.

== Psychological toll on protesters and Police officers ==
As protests and riots rage on throughout the world, there is an ongoing concern that riot control is having an impact on individuals' mental health. This rise in protests has caused an inevitable increase in law-enforcement violence, which has profound impacts on the mental health of protesters and police officers, including PTSD, anxiety, and depression. Studies have shown that rubber bullets, water cannons, and tear gas cause not only problems like eye irritation and external and internal injuries, but can also cause individuals to develop psychological issues. This all comes after the American Public Health Association named police violence as a "public health issue," making it crucial to study the psychological effects caused by riots.

The Hong Kong anti-extradition bill protests are an example that has been studied due to its psychological health effects, stemming from the severe nature of the police response. During these protests in Hong Kong, the police reportedly used upwards of 16,000 canisters of tear gas on these protesters. A survey of the Hong Kong protesters found that 25.7% of the population experienced depression, while 9.1% had thoughts of committing suicide. There were similar findings during the Arab Spring in Egypt, where school children in schools near the Tahrir Square (the location of massive riots) were experiencing higher rates of depression. In France, it was found that Yellow Vest protesters who encountered police violence had a 1.54% higher likelihood of experiencing severe depressive symptoms and were 2.58 times more likely to exhibit signs indicative of PTSD. In the whole scheme of police violence towards protesters, it is said that people who were involved in or just living in areas affected by riots could experience an uptick in PTSD by 4% to 41%.

Risk factors that can exacerbate mental health issues from riots:

- Lower socioeconomic status
- Female sex
- Prior exposure to violence
- Excessive social media use
- Lack of support from family and friends
- Ongoing personal conflicts

=== Psychological Effects on Police Officers ===
When considering the psychological effects of riot control, it is important to also examine how police officers are impacted by riots. They are exposed to some of the same risks and challenges, such as having objects thrown at them, being physically assaulted, and being exposed to RCA's. Even without considering riots, police officers already have almost double the risk of developing PTSD, depression, and anxiety than the average person. When working the frontline of a riot is added, these numbers are bound to go up. For example, during the unrest after the deaths of George Floyd and Breonna Taylor, the number of recorded cases of PTSD among police officers increased upwards of 30%. With the increase in mental illness from the civil unrest and public scrutiny, many police officers resigned, resorted to substance abuse, and even suicide.

Symptoms that Police Officers may face after riots:

- Increased heart rate
- Nervousness or restlessness
- Trembling
- Sweating
- Reduced Appetite
- Anxiety or restlessness
- Frequent or recurrent thoughts of death

==== January 6 United States Capitol Riots ====
On January 6, 2021, protestors stormed the Capitol Building in Washington D.C. in the United States. In the process, they beat, trampled and sprayed police officers with chemicals, overwhelmed the police, and harmed or threatened numerous police officers who attempted to stop them from entering the Capitol. As a result of this event, members of the Capitol Police and Metropolitan Police Department suffered from PTSD, anxiety, and depression. Police Officers Bobby Tabron and DeDivine K. Carter of the Metropolitan Police Department filed a lawsuit against former President, Donald J. Trump - stating that by inciting the mob, Donald Trump caused them "severe injuries" and great "emotional distress." Both officers claimed to suffer from recurrent dreams and thoughts of the attack on the Capitol Building. Beyond this lawsuit, multiple police officers who responded to the Capitol committed suicide in the following months:

- Metropolitan Police Officer Gunther Hashida
- Metropolitan Police Officer Kyle DeFreytag
- Capitol Police Officer Howard Liebengood
- Metropolitan Police Officer Jeffrey Smith

== Research ==
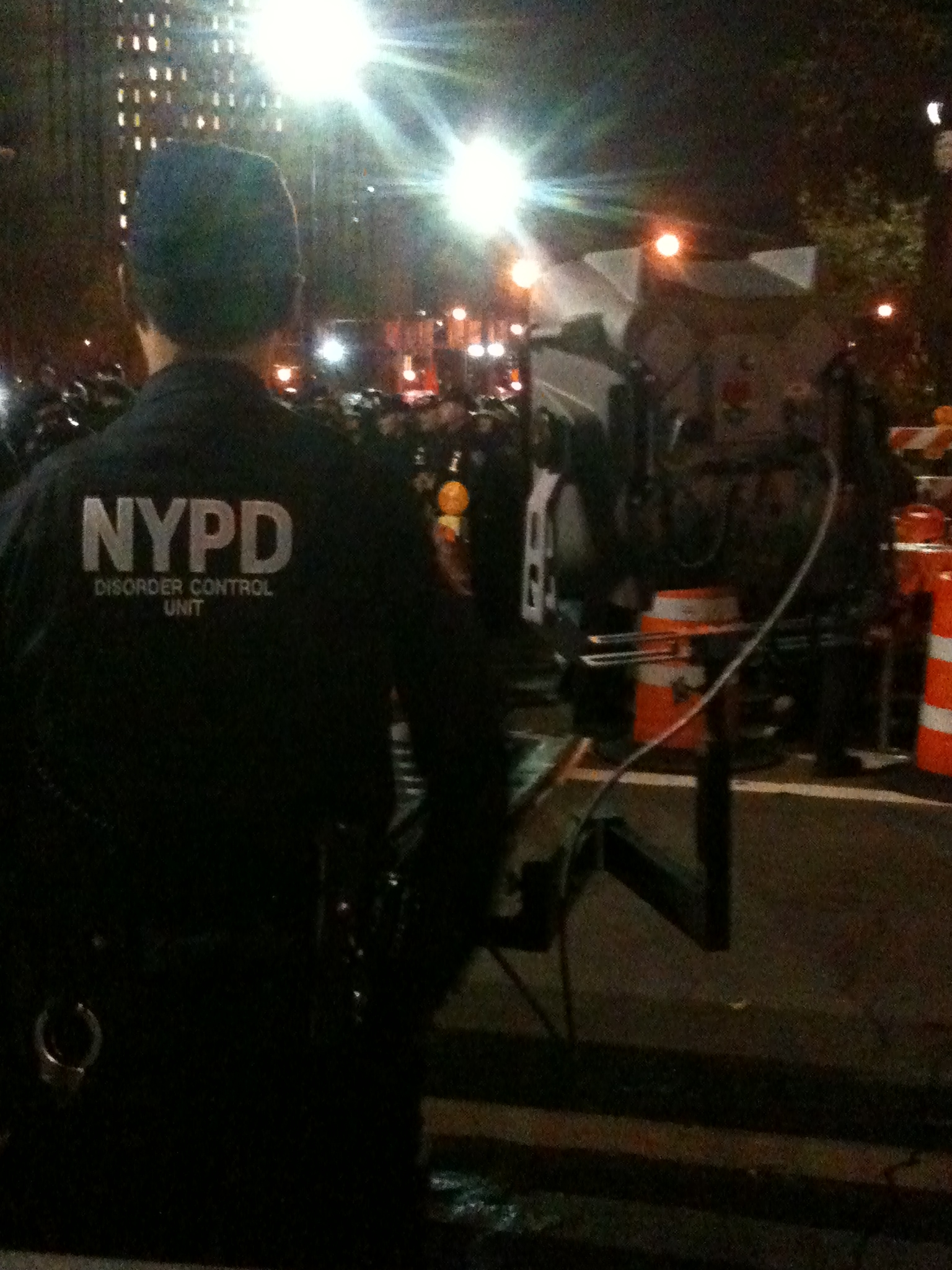
A New York City Police Department officer stands ready with a sonic weapon, the LRAD 500X

Research into weapons that are more effective for riot control continues. Netguns are non-lethal weapons designed to fire a net which entangles the target. Netguns have a long history of being used to capture wildlife, without injury, for research purposes. A netgun is currently in development for non-lethal riot control. Pepper-spray projectile launchers are projectile weapons that launch a fragile ball which breaks upon impact and releases an irritant powder called PAVA (capsaicin II) pepper. The launchers are often slightly modified .68 caliber paintball guns.

Stink bombs are devices designed to create an extremely unpleasant smell for riot control and area denial purposes. Stink bombs are believed to be less dangerous than other riot control chemicals, since they are effective at low concentrations. Sticky foam weapons are being tested, which cover and immobilize rioters with a gooey foam.

Low frequency sound cannons are weapons of various types that use sound to injure or incapacitate subjects using a focused beam of sound or infrasound. Active denial systems (ADS) are a non-lethal, directed-energy weapon developed by the U.S. military. The ADS directs electromagnetic radiation, specifically, high-frequency microwave radiation, at a frequency of 95 GHz, which causes the water in the upper epidermis to boil, stimulating a "burning" sensation in the nerve endings and generating intense pain. Dazzler lasers are directed-energy weapons that use intense light to cause temporary blindness or disorientation of rioters.

== See also ==
- Demoralization (warfare) – Warfare tactic used to erode morale
- Free speech zone – Area set aside in public places for the purpose of political protesting
- Personal armor – Protective clothing; armor worn on the body
- Blunt trauma personal protective equipment
- Baton charge – Police tactic for crowd dispersion
- Crowd control – Public security practice
- Crowd manipulation – Branch of social psychology
- Crowd crush – Type of disaster that occurs due to overcrowding
- Non-military armored vehicle – Armored vehicle operated outside military organizations
- Kettling – Police tactic of containing people at a protest
- Snatch squad – Tactics used by police in riot control

=== Riot control units ===
- Garda Public Order Unit (Ireland)
- Units for the Reinstatement of Order (Greece)
- Rapid Action Force (India)
- Mobile Brigade Corps (Indonesia)
- Compagnies Républicaines de Sécurité (France)
- Mobile Gendarmerie (France)
- Police Tactical Unit (Hong Kong)
  - Special Tactical Squad (Hong Kong)
- Territorial Support Group (London in England)
- Carabinieri Mobile Units Division (Italy)
- Mobile Unit (Italy)
- Riot Police Unit (Japan)
- Unidades de Intervención Policial (Spain)
- Çevik Kuvvet (Turkey)

=== Weapons used in riot control ===
- Non-lethal weapon
  - CS gas
  - Long Range Acoustic Device
  - Plastic bullets
  - Pepper spray
  - Rubber bullet
  - Water cannon
  - Pellet guns (pellet shotguns)
- Use of bayonets for crowd control
- Use of Camite during the 2024–2025 Georgian protests
