= Snatch squad =

Tactics used by police in riot control

The term "snatch squad" refers to two tactics used by police in riot control and crowd control.

== In riot control ==
The snatch squad in riot control involves several police officers, usually wearing protective riot gear, rushing forwards—occasionally in a flying wedge formation—to break through the front of a crowd, with the objective of snatching one or more individuals from a riot that are attempting to control the demonstration at which they are present. The target may be a leader or a speaker, or someone who seems to be leading the crowd.

In one British form of the tactic, three or four officers rush at a group of violent or disorderly people, with two of the officers carrying batons and the others a shield. The officer with the shield rushes the most violent in the group and forces the subject between the shield and a fixed object, while the other officers either arrest the others or escort them out of the crowds.

== Plainclothes snatch squads ==
A snatch squad may also refer to plainclothes police officers apprehending individuals, often in a looting situation. Often the plainclothes police officers will mingle with crowds intent on causing trouble and appear to be a bystander. The undercover officers can arrest any individual attempting to break or loot a store, often in an isolated scenario with few crowds as not to provoke an attack on the officers. Snatch squads are also employed against violent fugitives when they are otherwise likely to barricade themselves or use force in a search warrant setting.

== Images ==
- German police snatch squad ready for action (6th image on page)
