= Use of bayonets for crowd control =

Law enforcement technique

The use of bayonets for crowd control involves the utilization or display of bayonets by security forces to stop, disperse, or intimidate crowds of people. Their use in modern times is mainly for their psychological effect in calming an aggressive crowd or in preventing a crowd advancing along a certain route.

== Application ==
In addition to its use in warfare, the bayonet has a long history as a weapon employed in the control of unruly crowds. Prior to the advent of less-lethal weapons, police and military forces called upon for riot control were generally limited to firing live ammunition, or using bayonets or sabre charges.

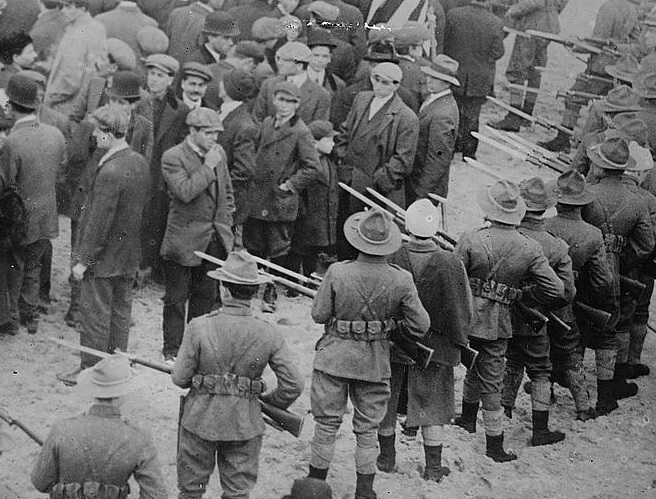
The Massachusetts Militia uses rifle-fixed bayonets in the "on guard" position to hold back strikers in Lawrence, Massachusetts in 1912.

In modern times, bayonets have generally been used for the psychological effect their display has in calming an aggressive crowd, or to corral mobs by making it impossible for them to advance down certain streets or avenues by blocking them with lines of police or soldiers holding rifle-fixed bayonets in the "on guard" (or, en garde) position. Nonetheless, the utility of the bayonet for crowd control has been questioned.

== Historical use by country ==
=== Burundi ===
According to reports of eyewitnesses and Human Rights Watch, police in Burundi used bayonets to control crowds during the aftermath of the failed 2015 Burundian coup d'état attempt.

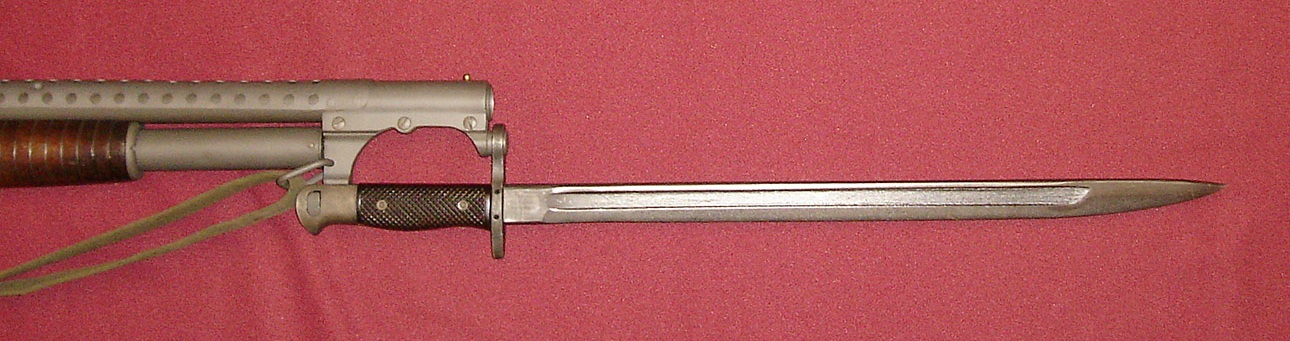
Bayonets have a long history as a crowd control device.

=== China ===
According to some accounts, soldiers of the 27th Group Army aggressively used bayonets against protesters during the Tiananmen Square protests of 1989.

=== South Korea ===
During the Gwangju Uprising of 1980, some physicians alleged treating people injured by bayonets used by the Republic of Korea Army.

=== United Kingdom ===
==== India ====
The British Indian Army made extensive use of the bayonet in crowd control operations in the British Raj.

==== Ireland ====
In Ireland during the 19th century, the Irish police used the bayonet charge as a method of forcing crowds to scatter; in July 1881 one person was killed by a police bayonet in this manner.

==== Hong Kong ====
The British Army continued its use of the bayonet as a crowd control weapon into the 20th century, using it during operations during the Hong Kong 1956 riots.

=== United States ===
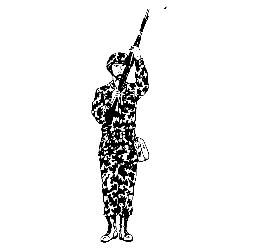
A diagram of a soldier holding his rifle, with bayonet affixed, in the "safe port" position.

The New York Draft Riots of 1863 saw the use of bayonet charges by the U.S. Army against unruly mobs in New York City. During lumber protests in Tacoma, Washington in 1935, the Washington National Guard advanced on picketers with fixed bayonets, causing them to move away from the Federal Building where they had gathered.

During 1968 revisions to the United States Army Field Manuals, there was a move by the United States Secretary of the Army to eliminate the description of the bayonet as a crowd control weapon; however, senior Army leadership resisted the change. A study conducted that year by the Human Resources Research Organization concluded that the bayonet "is highly valuable as a riot control weapon" with a survey of personnel involved in military peacekeeping operations reporting its most valuable attribute was its psychological effect on a crowd. A compromise was ultimately reached whereby use of the bayonet was permitted in cases of violent mobs but not in routine civil operations. Two years later, in the protests that led to the Kent State shootings of 1970, two persons were injured after being bayoneted by soldiers of the Ohio National Guard.

The 2004 edition of the U.S. Army's Field Manual 19-15: Civil Disturbances calls for troops operating in crowd control situations against violent mobs to form into multiple lines with the first line armed with batons, and the second line armed with rifle-fixed bayonets held in the "safe-port position". According to the manual, "in this elevated position, bayonets can be seen by participants in the rear of the crowd. The sight of bayonets can create an impression of strength and numerical superiority".

== See also ==
- Baton charge
