= Riot shield =

Protection device to prevent injury or harm

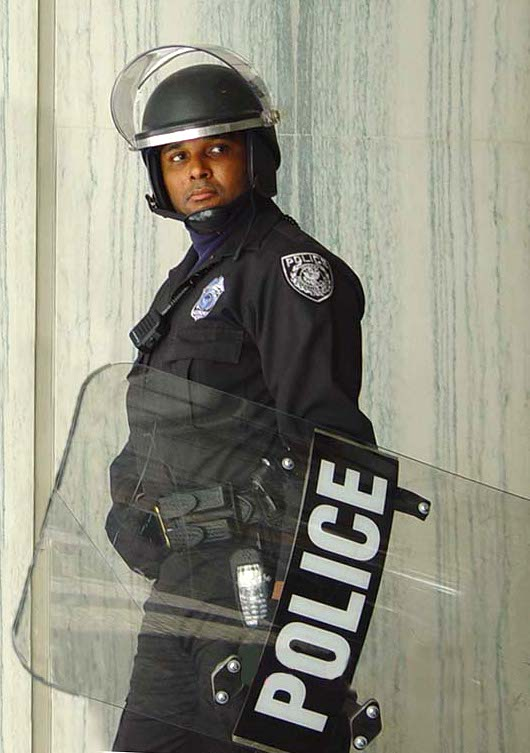
U.S. Federal Protective Service police officer with a riot shield

A riot shield is a lightweight protection device, typically deployed by riot police and some military units during protest, though also utilized by protestors. Riot shields are typically long enough to cover an average-sized person from the top of the head to the knees, though smaller one-handed models may also be used. They are generally intended to be used in riot control, to protect the user from melee attacks with blunt or edged weapons and also thrown projectiles, or non-lethal weapons such as rubber bullets and water cannons. They can also be used as short-ranged melee weapons to push back the opposing force. Most riot shields do not offer ballistic protection; ballistic shields are instead used in situations where heavily armed resistance is expected.

Riot shields are used in almost every country with a standardized police force and are produced by many companies. Law enforcement often use them in conjunction with a baton. Riot shields made for law enforcement are typically constructed from transparent polycarbonate to enable the bearer to see incoming thrown objects. Riot shields used by protesters are often constructed from improvised materials, such as wood, scrap metal or plastic barrels. While riot shields are shown to be effective in protecting the bearers and preventing protesters from breaking through police lines, their use may actually encourage people to throw objects.

== History ==
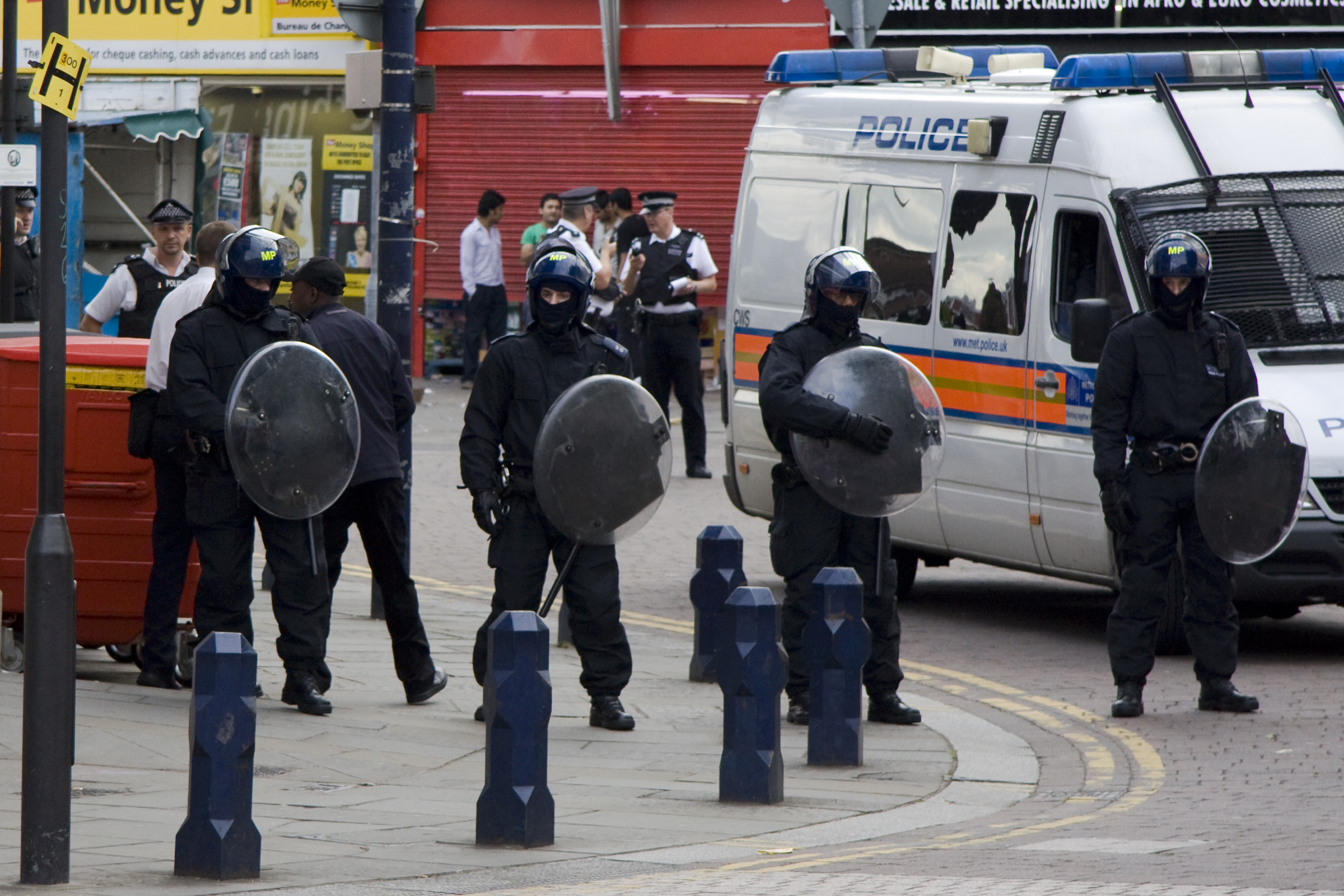
Officers of the Metropolitan Police carrying round riot shields during the 2011 England riots

The Police Federation of England and Wales began lobbying for the introduction of riot shields following the 1976 Notting Hill Carnival riot, during which many officers were injured with thrown stones, bricks and bottles. At the time, riot shields were already common in Northern Ireland and mainland Europe; British forces deployed them during the Cyprus Emergency in the 1950s, French police used them during the May 1968 riots, and British forces had been using them in Northern Ireland since at least 1969. Riot shields were first used in England during the 1977 Battle of Lewisham. While the Metropolitan Police Service designed them to be a passive and defensive item only, New Scientist reported "the production of the shields [at Lewisham] was part of what can only be described as an extremely aggressive operation." Many protesters were deliberately struck with the shields. A police spokesperson stated that a police officer who feels threatened would strike with whatever he had in his hands, adding "I don't see how you can stop him using the riot shield to hit a person."

During riots in the Republic of Ireland in the 1960s and 70s, the lack of riot shields was noted. Army personnel responding to a protest at Curragh who lacked riot shields instead used bayonets for crowd control. When a riot in Lifford resulted in nine injuries to the Garda Síochána, it was reported that riot shields had not been available. Forty-four army personnel turned up to a riot in Monaghan with only five riot shields between them. In response to the shortage, 200 riot shields were manufactured in Dublin in 1972.

== Design and types ==
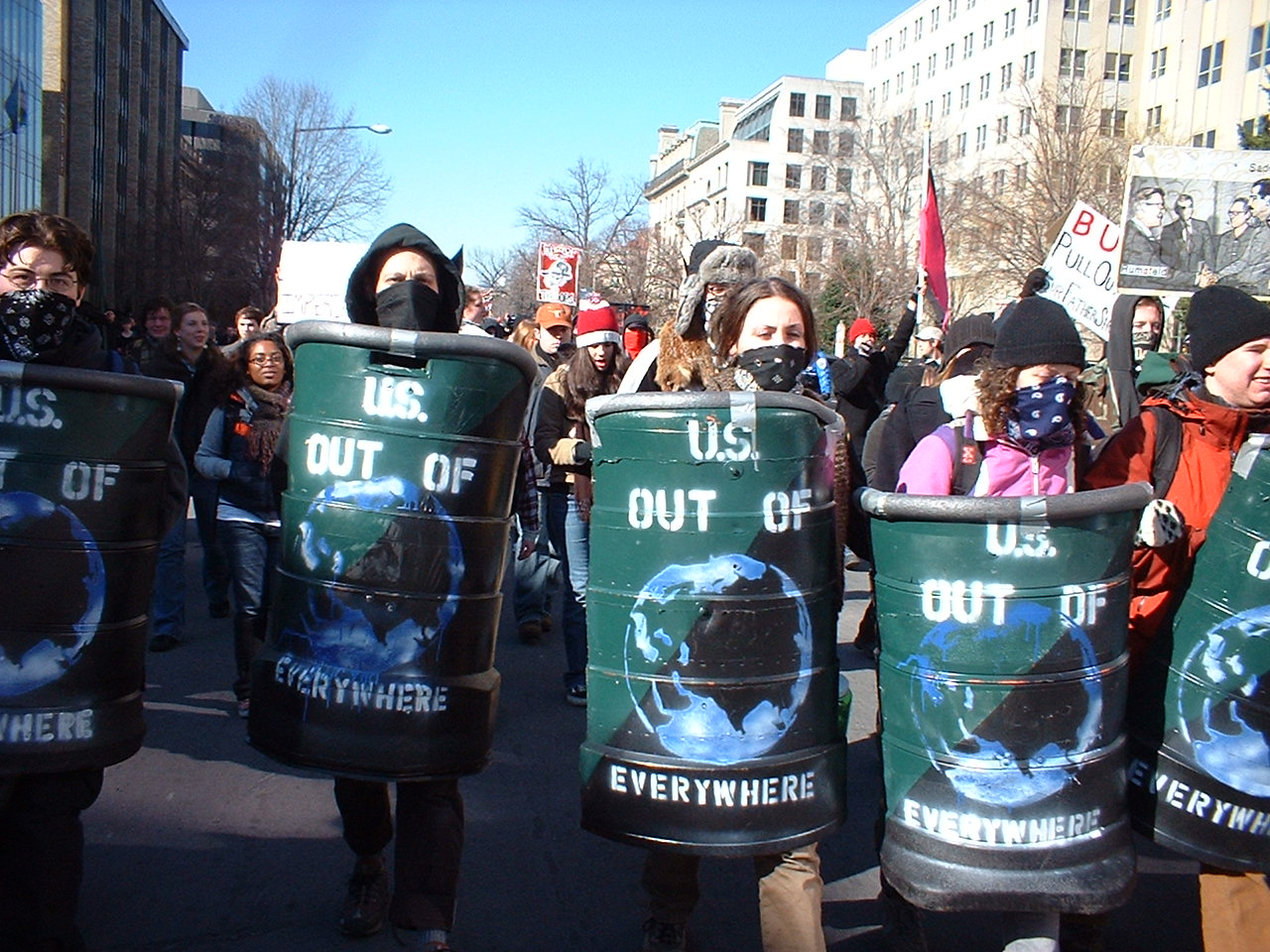
Anti-war protesters in Washington, D.C., with improvised riot shields

Riot shields are typically made out of transparent polycarbonate between 4–6 millimetres (0.16–0.24 in) in thickness. Shields are designed to be shatter resistant, though are typically not ballistic resistant. Some shields used to counter rioters offer a form of ballistic protection against lower velocity ammunition fired from handguns or shotguns. However, ballistic shields are instead used in situations where heavily armed resistance is expected.

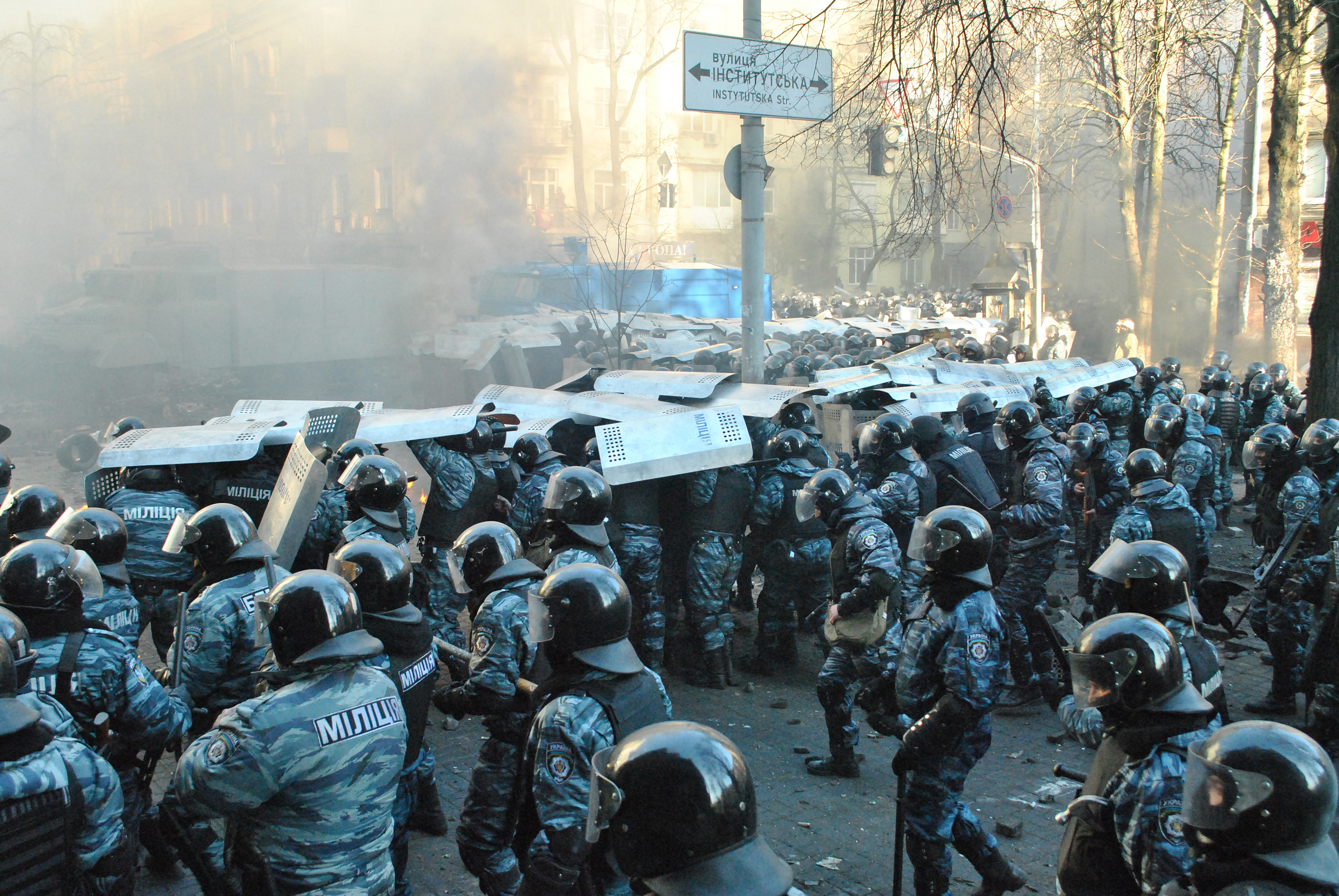
Internal Troops of Ukraine and "Berkut" using metal shields during clashes on Instytutska Street during Euromaidan

Shields are typically either round or rectangular in shape, with lengths between 36–48 inches (91–122 cm) and varying widths. Most riot shields, when utilised properly, will protect the user from the top of the head to the knees. Shields will typically be slightly cylindrical and have handles made out of either metal or reinforced plastic affixed to them with either glue or grommets. Handles will be designed so that the shield-bearer can hold onto them with a fist, and the shield will often feature additional protection at the point where the forearm rests against it, as well as Velcro-strapping to keep the forearm in place. A shield may have a storage compartment for a baton or non-lethal weapon, and some may be designed to be interlocking with a shield on either side, so as to form a more effective shield wall. The type of shield used will vary, depending on both the situation and objective of a mission and also department budgets.

Concave shields have been designed for pinning down and hand-cuffing rioters or prisoners, and electric shields designed to deliver a non-lethal electric shock to the person the shield is in contact with also exist. These shields, which began being manufactured in the 1980s, feature metal strips on the outside of the polycarbonate. A shock is delivered through the strips via a button on the side held by the bearer. Electric shields have caused several deaths. In 2011, Raytheon filed a patent for an acoustic riot shield that emits "a low-frequency sound which resonates with the respiratory tract, making it hard to breathe".

Protesters may also deploy their own improvised riot shields, made from material such as wood, particle board or scrap metal.

== Use and effectiveness ==
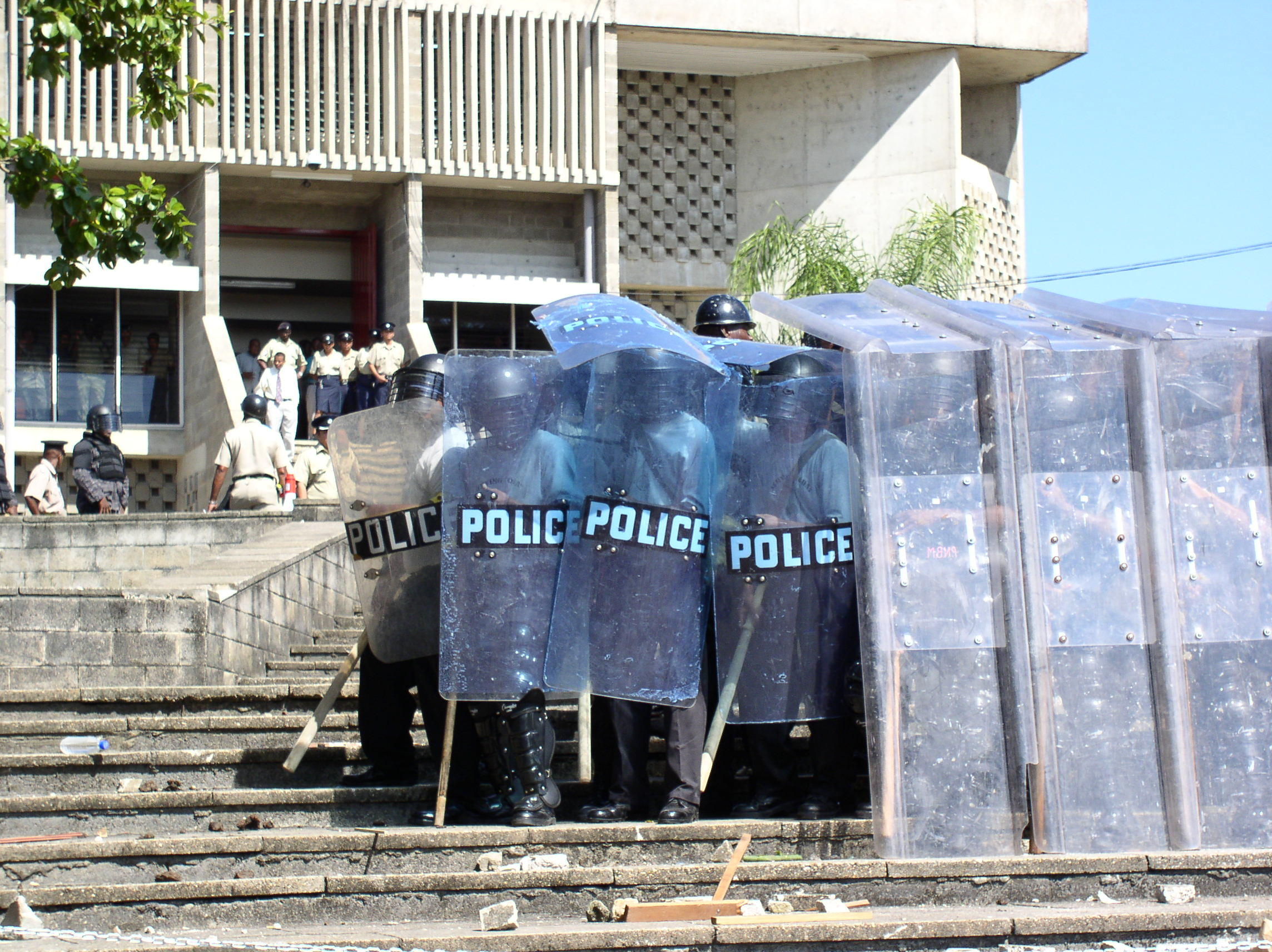
Police in Belize form a testudo shield wall

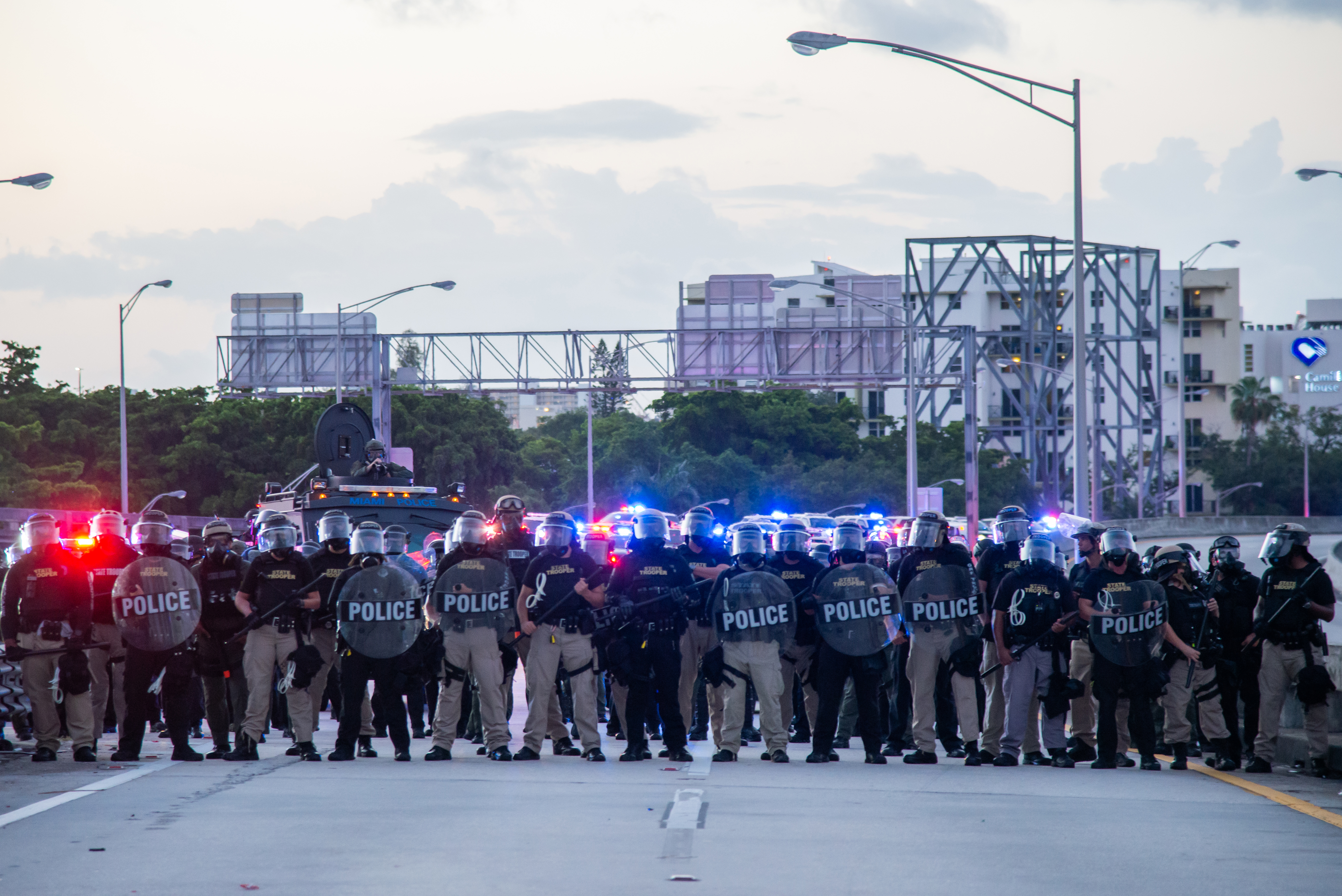
Police in the United States utilizing round riot shields with batons

Whether riot shields are used will depend on the commanding officer's choice of force in combating protesters. It is recommended that security forces equipped with riot shields also utilise non-lethal weapons, overwatch, and reserve forces. The riot shield is designed primarily as a defensive weapon, though it can be used in an offensive manner when in direct contact with protesters. They are designed to be affixed to the non-dominant arm and held at a slightly inward angle to deflect thrown objects into the ground. When protesters come in direct contact with riot shields they will typically try and take hold of them. If protesters attempt to grab the top of a shield, security forces are instructed to strike at them with their free hand. If protesters attempt to grab the bottom of a shield, they are instructed to drop to one-knee and ram the shield into the ground with force, thereby pinning the protester's fingers or hands. Riot shields are frequently used in combination with batons.

Riot shields have been shown to be an effective way of driving back protesters and preventing them from pushing through police lines. A National Union of Mineworkers official stated that while it had been very difficult to break through police lines in the 1972 UK miners' strike when police had no shields and were relying heavily on the wedge formation, it had become outright impossible by the 1984 strike as by then the police had abandoned the wedge and instead adopted the riot shield and baton combination. The official concluded that unarmed protesters stand no chance against police with riot shields. The riot shield and baton combination is considered strong enough to handle all but the most extreme riots. If this combination is not deemed sufficient police may escalate to using additional methods such as water cannons, CS gas and rubber bullets.

Riot shields may be used in conjunction with non-lethal weapons such as CS gas in a method known as the "Tap-down technique". In this method, an officer with a projectile weapon will approach a shield-bearer from behind and tap on their shoulder. In response, the shield-bearer will drop to one knee while keeping the riot shield affixed in front. The officer with the projectile weapon will lean into the shield-bearer's back with their knee, extend the barrel of their weapon over the shield and fire. This method allows maximum protection to both the firer and the shield-bearer. "Extraction teams" also use shields to their advantage. An extraction team is generally made up of reserve forces, and serves to extract personnel in danger or capture individual protesters. The team can be deployed from any point behind a shield wall. On instruction, two officers on the front line will take a step back and to the left and right respectively, allowing a temporary gap from which several officers will depart; the gap will be closed after the last officer has gone through. A target will be identified, and it will be the pre-assigned goal of one officer to control the target and another to cuff them. Additional officers will provide cover. Once the protester has been restrained, the shield wall will temporarily open to allow the protester to be dragged through. It is recommended that extraction teams venture no further than 10 m (33 ft) from the shield wall.

While riot shields offer an effective form of protection in themselves, their use may encourage people to throw objects at the bearers. A chief superintendent in the UK stated that while protesters were generally reluctant to assault police, that reluctance seemed to disappear if officers had riot shields. It has been observed that protesters may not throw objects until the police bring in shields, and some people will deliberately throw objects at the shields themselves, indicating that they do not actually want to injure the police.
