= Lathi (stick) =

Bamboo stick

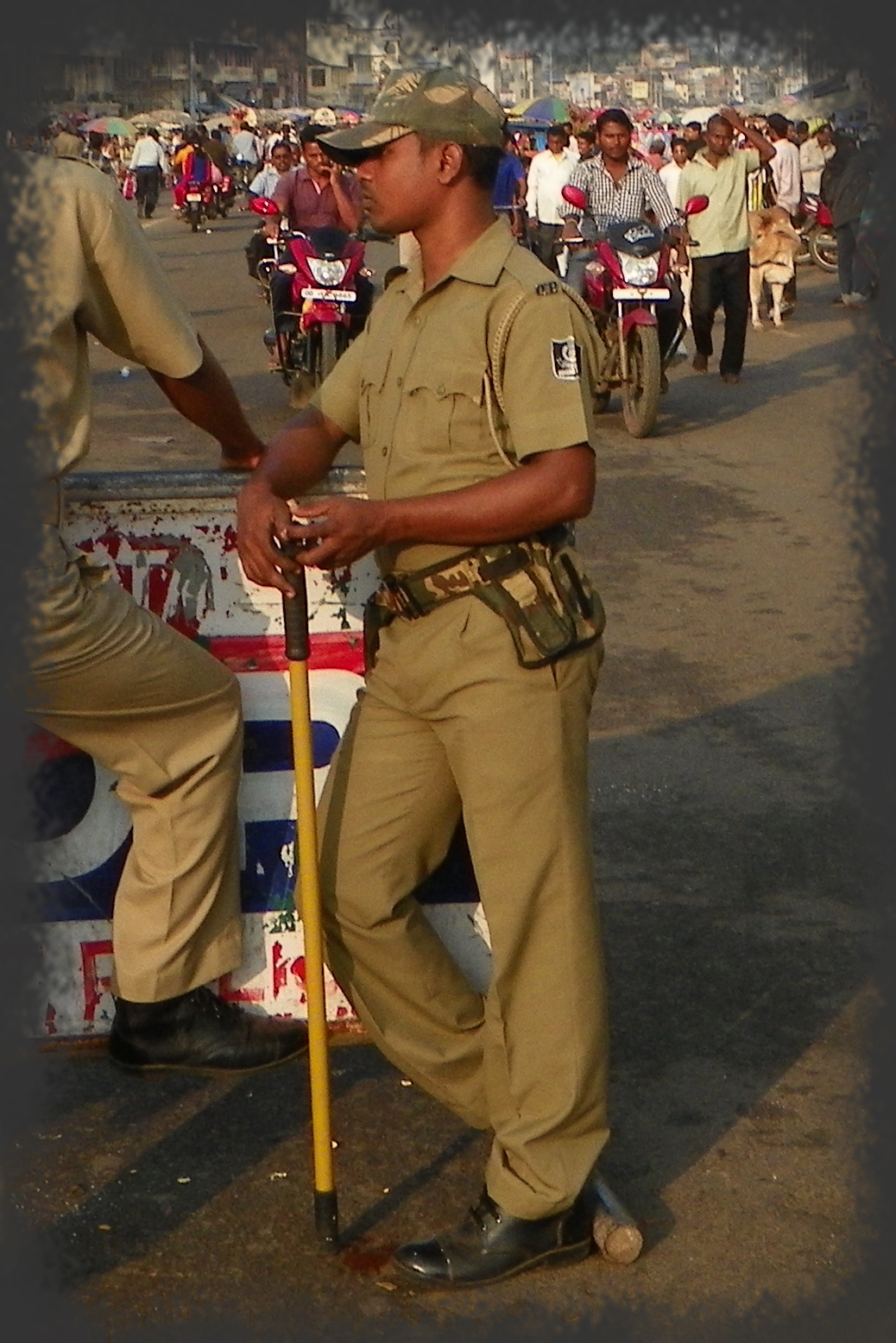
Indian police officer with a lathi stick.

The lathi is a bamboo stick used by the police in India, Pakistan, Bangladesh, Nepal and Sri Lanka. It has been used in mainland Indian subcontinent since the Mughal Empire.

The lathi can measure from 60 cm (~23.6 in) to more than a metre (~39.4 in) in length. One end can, at times, have a metal point. Lathis are the most commonly used crowd control weapon in India, Nepal, Pakistan, Bangladesh and Sri Lanka and are used to lathi-charge mobs and rioters.
