= HyperSpike =

Specialist speaker system

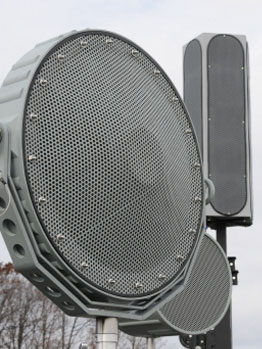
HyperSpike products (from left to right). The HS-24, the HS-16 and an MA-2

HyperSpike is a brand name for acoustic products manufactured by Ultra Electronics – Undersea Sensor Systems Inc. (USSI), in Columbia City, Indiana. HyperSpike is composed of a line of acoustic hailing devices that feature integrated electronics with a flat frequency response curve.

== History ==
HyperSpike was originally invented by Curt Graber of Wattre Corporation. In 2008, Wattre and Ultra Electronics – USSI signed a teaming agreement for the design and manufacture of an array of acoustic hailing devices. A teaming agreement is an interim agreement between partners which commits them to their roles during the development and marketing stage of a project. It would generally be transformed into a formal sub-contracting agreement once an order for delivery has been placed. Since 2008, over 8 new devices have been released. HyperSpike products currently hold the Guinness Book of World Records position for the loudest electro-acoustic projection device at 182.2 dB.

== Characteristics ==
HyperSpike units are created out of custom composite materials or carbon fiber. Each is sealed against the environment and has been designed to operate in extreme environmental conditions including hot, cold, blowing dust, freezing rain, and torrential downpours. HyperSpike units are weatherproof, not waterproof. Each directional unit has an integrated electronics package, which increases usability and decreases overall package weight. Certain high-output models are also manufactured with an output selector switch that can toggle between the hearing safe "low" and extreme output level "high." Finally, new HyperSpike units have been manufactured with an integrated network port.

=== Inputs ===
All HyperSpike units have three inputs for sound. These inputs use unique Amphenol connectors so that they cannot be accidentally interchanged in extreme situations. The details for each type of connector are below:

1. Dynamic Microphone This CB-Style microphone is designed to adapt to user input. The louder the input, the louder the HyperSpike output. The dynamic microphone is activated by a thumb-toggle.
2. AUX In Using a standard 3.5 mm (1/8 in) headphone jack, a HyperSpike can accept any commercial audio source including iPods, Zunes, and other MP3 players. The AUX In is always on.
3. Alert Tone Each HyperSpike has an alert-tone button that puts out a frequency designed to gain attention. This button can only output the alert tone.

== Models ==
HyperSpike models are divided into two types, directional and omni-directional. The directional units can also be integrated into a remote-controlled platform. The Omnidirectional units can also remote-controlled through an IP network.

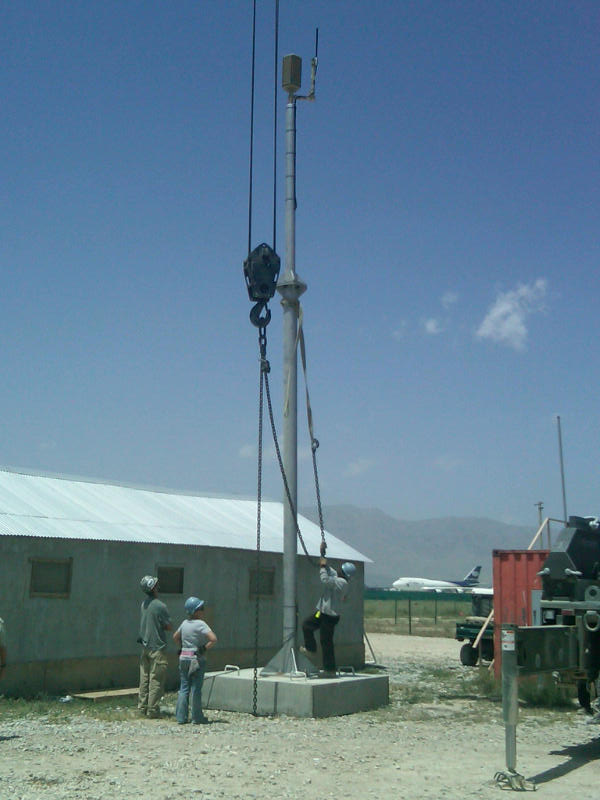
An omni-directional HyperSpike MA-1 AHD on a concrete pad in Afghanistan. The MA-1 AHD is used by the US Army as the early warning component of the Counter Rocket, Artillery, & Mortar (C-RAM) system. Over 200 units have been fielded.

=== Directional models ===
Directional HyperSpikes are characterized by their ability to form a narrow beam of sound. This collimated beam can range from 5 degrees to 15 degrees at 2 kHz. The current models offered are detailed below with their maximum sound pressure level.

- HS-18 156 dBA @1m

=== Omnidirectional models ===
These HyperSpike products emit high volumes in a 360 radius. At 50' the units can be heard over 1.5 miles away. The MA series of acoustic hailing devices consist of a hexagonal array of transducers. As the number of transducers increases, the potential output increases. As such, the MA-2 is essentially two MA-1 emitter heads. The current models are detailed below with their maximum sound pressure level.

- TCPA-Omni 129 dB @1m

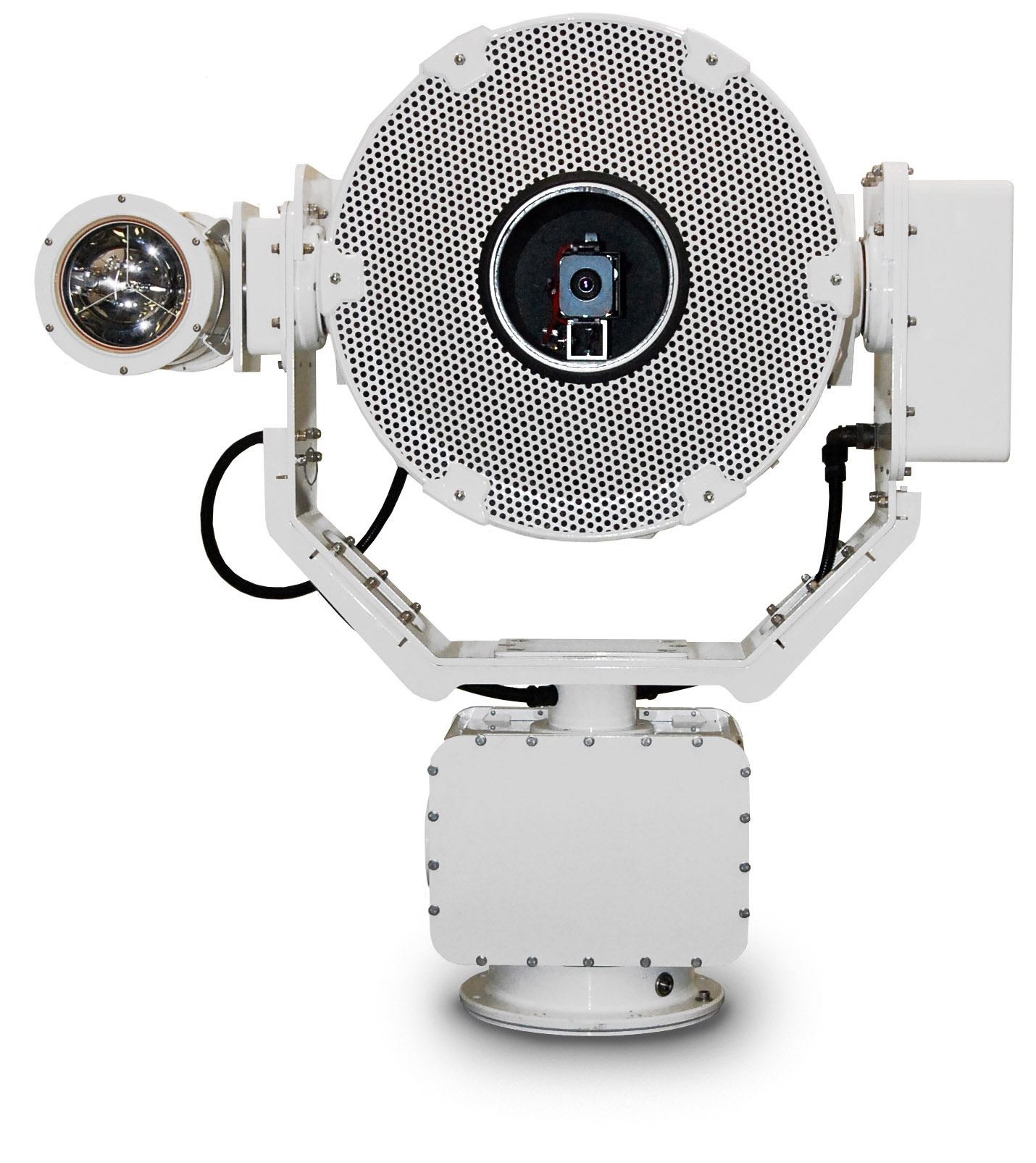
The HyperSpike HS-18 RAHD with a daylight camera mounted in the OptiPort and illuminator mounted externally

=== Remote-controlled models ===
Recently, the HS-14 and HS-18 have been integrated into a pan/tilt platform with partner corporation MOOG. This platform, named the HS-14 RAHD or HS-18 RAHD (Remote Acoustic Hailing Device), is an IP-controlled remote system that can be integrated with any sensor. In addition, these units can be equipped with advanced software analytics capable of detecting human or machine forms at distances in excess of 1000 meters. Examples of integrable sensors include:

- Daylight Cameras
- Thermal Cameras
- Infrared Cameras
- Night-Vision Cameras
- Illuminator (Adjustable Spot Light)
- Avian Radars
- Ground Radars

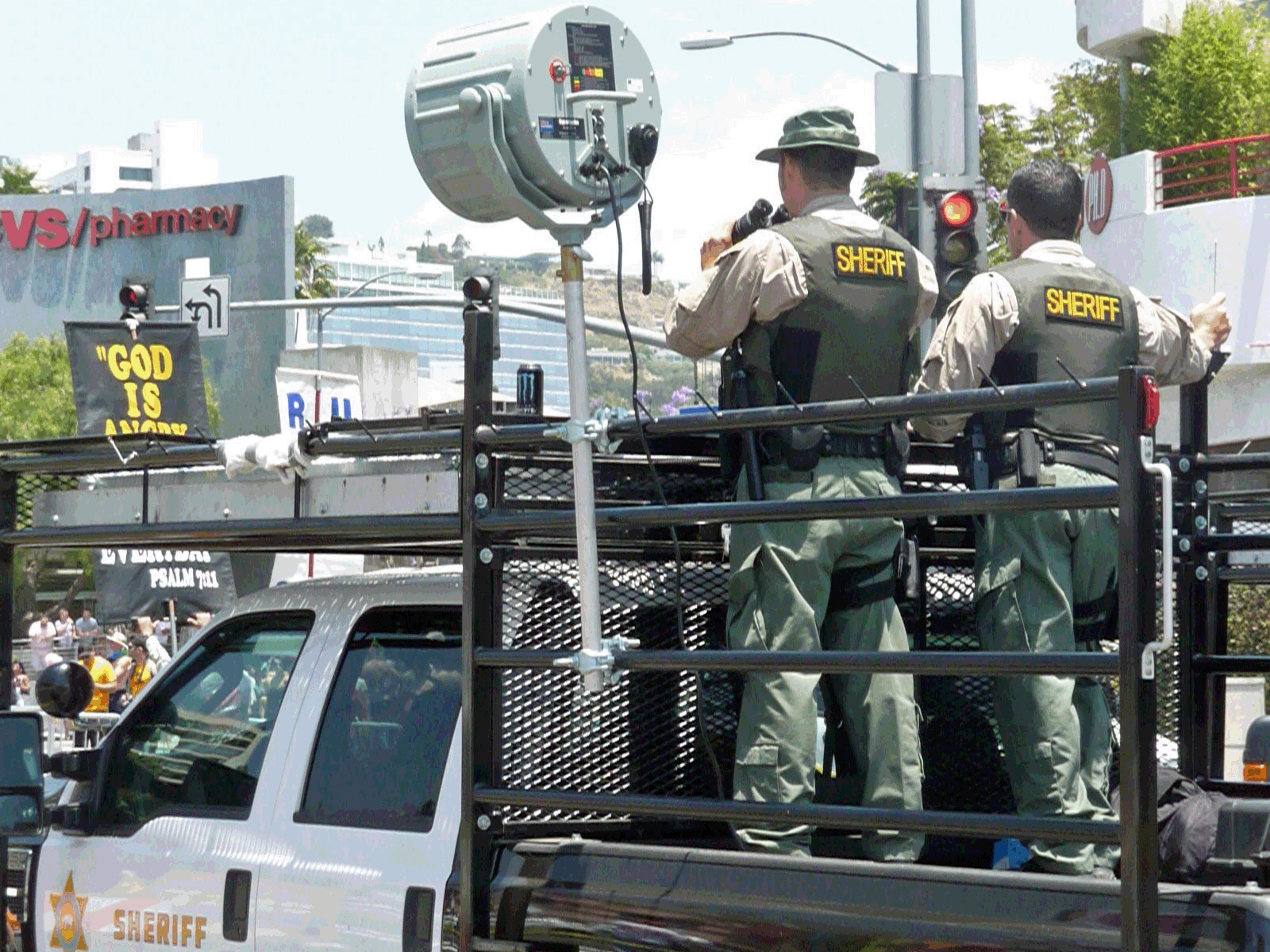
A HS-16 in use after a Lakers game in Los Angeles

== Field usage ==
Directional HyperSpike models are in service with various domestic and international and private, law enforcement, and military users. Notable users include the United States Navy, United States Army, United States Coast Guard, Allen County SWAT (Fort Wayne, IN), the French Navy, the Malaysian Navy, Indonesia Police and various international energy conglomerates.

The MA-1 is currently in service with the United States Army for their Counter Rocket, Artillery, and Mortar (C-RAM) program. In addition, units have been fielded for use at large tradeshows, for the United States Air Force, and international navies.

== See also ==
- Acoustic Hailing Device
- Sound pressure
- Acoustics
- Loudspeaker
