= Active Denial System =

Non-lethal, directed-energy weapon (2002–current)

Active Denial System (ADS)
- Place of origin: United States

Service history
- Wars: War in Afghanistan

Production history
- Manufacturer: Raytheon
- Variants: ADS II; Silent Guardian

Specifications

The Active Denial System (ADS) is a directed-energy weapon developed by the U.S. military, designed for area denial, perimeter security and crowd control. Informally, the weapon is also called the heat ray since it works by heating the surface of targets, such as the skin of targeted human beings. Raytheon had marketed a reduced-range version of this technology. ADS was developed under the sponsorship of the Department of Defense Non-Lethal Weapons Program with the Air Force Research Laboratory as the lead agency. The ADS was deployed in 2010 with the United States military in the Afghanistan War, but was withdrawn without seeing combat. On August 20, 2010, the Los Angeles Sheriff's Department announced its intent to use this technology within the United States to control incarcerated people in the Pitchess Detention Center in Los Angeles, stating its intent to use it in "operational evaluation" in situations such as breaking up prisoner fights. They installed the smaller-sized unit in 2014. The U.S. Marines and police were both working on portable versions. In 2014, there were reports that Russia and China were developing their own versions of the Active Denial System.

== Mechanism and effects ==
The ADS works by firing a high-powered (100 kW output power) beam of 95 GHz waves at a target, which corresponds to a wavelength of 3.2 mm. The ADS millimeter wave energy works on a principle similar to a microwave oven, exciting the water and fat molecules in the skin, and instantly heating them via dielectric heating. One significant difference is that a microwave oven uses the much lower frequency (and longer wavelength) of 2.45 GHz. The short millimeter waves used in ADS only penetrate the top layers of skin, with most of the energy being absorbed within 0.4 mm (1/64 inch), whereas microwaves will penetrate into human tissue about 17 mm (0.67 in).

The ADS's effect of repelling humans occurs at slightly higher than 44 °C (111 °F), though first-degree burns occur at about 51 °C (124 °F), and second-degree burns occur at about 58 °C (136 °F). In testing, pea-sized blisters have been observed in less than 0.1% of ADS exposures, indicating that second degree surface burns have been caused by the device. The radiation burns caused are similar to microwave burns, but only on the skin surface due to the decreased penetration of shorter millimeter waves. The surface temperature of a target will continue to rise so long as the beam is applied, at a rate dictated by the target's material and distance from the transmitter, along with the beam's frequency and power level set by the operator. Most human test subjects reached their pain threshold within 3 seconds, and none could endure more than 5 seconds.

A spokesman for the Air Force Research Laboratory described his experience as a test subject for the system:

For the first millisecond, it just felt like the skin was warming up. Then it got warmer and warmer and you felt like it was on fire. ... As soon as you're away from that beam your skin returns to normal and there is no pain.

Like all focused energy, the beam will irradiate all matter in the targeted area, including everything beyond/behind it that is not shielded, with no possible discrimination between individuals, objects or materials. Anyone incapable of leaving the target area (e.g., physically handicapped, infants, incapacitated, trapped, etc.) would continue to receive radiation until the operator turned off the beam. Reflective materials such as aluminum cooking foil should reflect this radiation and could be used to make clothing that would be protective against this radiation.

Following approximately ten thousand test exposures of volunteers to ADS beams, a Penn State Human Effects Advisory Panel (HEAP) concluded that ADS is a non-lethal weapon that has a high probability of effectiveness with a low probability of injury:

- no significant effects for wearers of contact lenses or other eyewear (including night vision goggles)
- normal skin applications, such as cosmetics, have little effect on ADSʼs interaction with skin
- no age-related differences in response to ADS exposures
- no effect on the male reproduction system
- damage was the occurrence of pea-sized blisters in less than 0.1% of the exposures (6 of 10,000 exposures).

In April 2007, one airman in an ADS test was overdosed and received second-degree burns on both legs, and was treated in a hospital for two days. There was also one laboratory accident in 1999 that resulted in a small second-degree burn.

=== Safety studies ===
Many possible long-term effects have been studied, with the conclusion that no long-term effects are likely at the exposure levels studied. However, overexposures of either operators or targets may cause thermal injury. According to an official military assessment, "In the event of an overexposure to a power density sufficient to produce thermal injury, there is an extremely low probability that scars derived from such injury might later become cancerous. Proper wound management further decreases this probability, as well as the probability of hypertrophic scarring or keloid formation."

- Cancer: A mouse cancer study was performed at two energy levels and exposures with a 94 GHz transmitter: a single 10-second, 1 W/cm^{2} exposure, and repeated 10-second exposures over a two-week period at 333 mW/cm^{2}. At both energy levels, no increase in skin cancers was observed. No studies of higher energy levels, or longer exposure times have been performed on millimeter-wave systems.
- Cornea damage: Tests on non-human primate eyes have observed no short-term or long-term damage as the blink reflex protects the eye from damage within 0.25 seconds.
- Blisters and scarring: Pea-sized blistering due to second degree burns occurred in a very small minority (less than 0.1%) of tested exposures, which have a remote potential for scarring.

ADS operators would be exposed to more than the standard maximum permissible exposure (MPE) limits for RF energy, and military use requires an exception to these exposure limits.

ADS Safety Studies have been independently reviewed by a non-government human effect advisory panel.

== History ==
=== Development ===
Two Active Denial Systems were developed under a Defense Department "Advanced Concept Technology Demonstration" Program (now known as Joint Concept Technology Demonstration Program) from 2002 to 2007. Unlike typical weapons development programs in the Defense Department, ACTDs/JCTDs are not focused on optimizing the technology; rather they are focused on rapidly assembling the technology in a configuration suitable for user evaluation.

=== Contracts ===
On September 22, 2004, Raytheon was granted an FCC license to demonstrate the technology to "law enforcement, military and security organizations."

On October 4, 2004, the United States Department of Defense published the following contract information:

Communications and Power Industries (CPI), Palto Alto [sic], Calif., is being awarded a $6,377,762 costs-reimbursement, cost-plus fixed-price contract. The contractor shall design, build, test, and deliver a two to 2.5 megawatt, high efficiency, continuous wave (CW) 95 gigahertz millimeter wave source system. The contractor shall perform extensive modeling, simulation, experiments, and testing to the maximum capabilities of their facilities (which shall no less than one megawatt peak RF output) that will ascertain the final CW capabilities of the source. The contractor also shall provide input for the requirements for the government's test stand, which will serve as a full power facility in the future. At this time, $900,000 of the funds has been obliged. This work will be complete by January 2009. Negotiations were completed September 2004. The Air Force Research Laboratory, Kirtland Air Force Base, New Mexico, is the contracting activity (FA9451-04-C-0298).

=== Demonstration ===
The military has made the ADS available to the media for demonstrations on a number of occasions. A fully operational and mounted version of the system was demonstrated on January 24, 2007, at Moody Air Force Base in Georgia. A Reuters correspondent who volunteered to be shot with the beam during the demonstration described it as "similar to a blast from a very hot oven – too painful to bear without diving for cover." An Associated Press reporter who volunteered to be engaged stated "They certainly convinced me that the system could help save the lives of innocent civilians and our young service members". A CBS News correspondent did an in-depth story on ADS in March 2008. A demonstration was conducted for the media on March 9, 2012, at Marine Corps Base Quantico, Virginia.

=== Afghanistan deployment ===
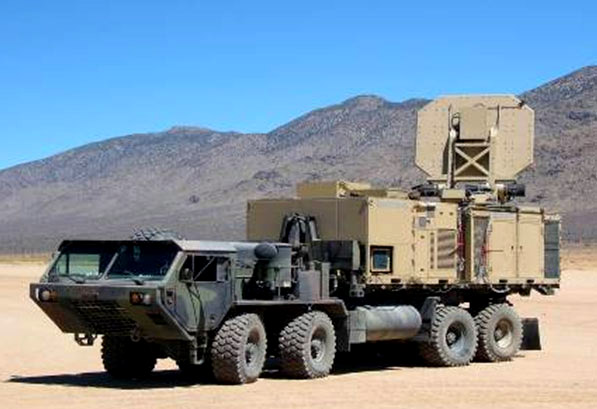
An operational version of the Active Denial System (2008)

On June 21, 2010, Lt. Col. John Dorrian, a spokesman for the NATO forces commander General Stanley McChrystal, confirmed in an e-mail to Wired reporter Noah Shachtman that the ADS was deployed in Afghanistan. The spokesman added however that the system had not yet been used operationally.

The ADS had been removed from service in Afghanistan by July 19, 2010. A former Principal Deputy Assistant Secretary of Defense noted that the recall of ADS from Afghanistan was an "opportunity missed" and "the non-lethality of the ADS system could prove useful in a counterinsurgency operation where avoidance of civilian casualties is essential to mission success."

=== Potential deployment against civilians ===
In September 2020 it was revealed that federal officials had explored the use of the device and the Long Range Acoustic Device to disperse civilians protesting outside the White House in June of that year, but had been advised that the National Guard was not currently in possession of either device.

Additionally, In August 2020, it was revealed that the use of the device had allegedly been considered in 2018 on the Mexico-United States border to prevent further illegal immigration. However Kirstjen Nielsen, then secretary of homeland security, rejected any use of the device, and forbade it being discussed again. This was reported on by the New York Times following information from two former officials, however a spokesperson would deny those claims.

=== Problems ===
There have been speculations in open literature for why the ADS has not been used in a theater of operations. Some of the claimed problems expressed have included: (1) that a potential unreliability in certain environmental conditions, because precipitation (rain/snow/fog/mist) commonly dissipates RF energy, which may moderate the ADS's sensation to "warm and comfortable"; (2) that ADS may only work successfully against exposed skin, implying that heavier clothing may reduce its effectiveness and that its tactical usefulness may potentially be limited in striking specific personnel hiding in crowds of civilians, because this 'hiding' situation has not been seen in all recent theaters of operation (was reportedly observed in Somalia and Iraq, but reportedly not in Afghanistan). What the actual performance of ADS is relative to these concerns is not presently known to be published in open literature.

=== Future ===
Following the development of two prototype systems for the ACTD, interest remains in the technology by the military as a means to minimize collateral damage and increase force protection. Research continues on technology that will make it smaller, more reliable, and able to be used on the move, for example, in protection of convoys.

== Concepts for use ==
ADS was developed as a non-lethal weapon. According to Department of Defense policy, non-lethal weapons "are explicitly designed and primarily employed so as to incapacitate personnel or material, while minimizing fatalities, permanent injury to personnel, and undesired damage to property and the environment." ADS has applications for crowd control and perimeter defense, and filling "the gap between shouting and shooting." Other crowd control methods – including pepper spray, tear gas, water cannons, sound cannons, slippery foam and rubber bullets – carry implicit dangers of temporary or permanent injury or accidental death, and often leave residue or residual material. ADS can be used to effectively warn of escalation of force, and gradually increase the transmitted force from relatively benign to ultimately forced dispersal of a crowd. A group of people can theoretically be dispersed or induced to leave an area in a manner unlikely to damage personnel, non-involved civilians (no stray bullets), or to nearby buildings or the environment.

Non-lethal weapons are intended to provide options to U.S. troops, for example, "to stop suspicious vehicles without killing the drivers". Although the ADS millimeter wave frequency does not affect a car's electronic components, it can be used to deter a driver in an approaching vehicle. In a broader strategic context, non-lethal weapons such as ADS have the potential to offer "precision, accuracy, and effective duration that can help save military and civilian lives, break the cycle of violence by offering a more graduated response, and even prevent violence from occurring if the opportunity for early or preclusionary engagement arises."

The Council on Foreign Relations noted that "wider integration of existing types of nonlethal weapons (NLW) into the U.S. Army and Marine Corps could have helped to reduce the damage done by widespread looting and sabotage after the cessation of major conflict in Iraq."

In Afghanistan, the need to minimize civilian casualties has led to restrictive rules of engagement on the use of lethal force by US troops. A National Public Radio correspondent in Afghanistan "witnessed troops grappling with the dilemma of whether to shoot." Non-lethal weapons such as ADS provide an option for US forces in those situations.

== Testing and concerns ==
The effects of this device on humans have been studied by the military for years, and much, but not all of the research has been published openly in peer-reviewed journals.

Active Denial System Demo

A news article criticized the sheer amount of time it is taking to field this system, citing the potential it had to avert a great deal of pain and suffering in volatile areas around the world.

While it is claimed not to cause burns under "ordinary use", it is also described as being similar to that of an incandescent light bulb being pressed against the skin, which can cause severe burns in just a few seconds. The beam can be focused up to 700 meters away, and is said to penetrate thick clothing although not walls. At 95 GHz, the frequency is much higher than the 2.45 GHz of a microwave oven magnetron. This frequency was chosen because it penetrates less than 1/64 of an inch (0.40 mm), which – in most humans, except for eyelids and the thinner skin of babies – avoids the second skin layer (the dermis) where critical structures are found such as nerve endings and blood vessels.

The early methodology of testing, in which volunteers were asked to remove glasses, contact lenses and metallic objects that could cause hot spots, raised concerns as to whether the device would remain true to its purpose of non-lethal temporary incapacitation if used in the field where safety precautions would not be taken. However, these tests were early in the program and part of a thorough and methodical process to demonstrate the safety and effectiveness of the technology, which has now involved more than 600 volunteer subjects and some 10,200 exposures. As safety was demonstrated in each step of the process, restrictions were removed, and now, according to ADS proponents, there are no restrictions or precautions necessary for volunteers experiencing the effect. Long-term exposure to the beam may cause more serious damage, especially to sensitive tissues, such as those of the eyes. Two people received second degree burns after exposure to the device during testing.

Critics cite that despite the stated intent of the ADS is to be a non-lethal device designed to temporarily incapacitate, and despite that ADS had undergone legal and treaty compliance reviews by AF/JAO and determined to be in compliance with the applicable laws and treaties, that modifications or misuse by an operator could nevertheless turn the ADS into a more damaging weapon which could potentially violate international conventions on warfare.

Some have focused on the lower threshold of use which may lead those who use them to become "trigger-happy", especially in dealing with peaceful protesters. Others have focused on concerns that weapons whose operative principle is that of inflicting pain (though "non-lethal") might be useful for such purposes as torture, as they may leave little or no evidence of use, but undoubtedly have the capacity to inflict horrific pain on a restrained subject. According to Wired, the ADS has been rejected for fielding in Iraq due to Pentagon fears that it would be regarded as an instrument of torture.

== Smaller units ==
Defense contractor Raytheon has developed a smaller version of the ADS, the Silent Guardian. This stripped-down model is directly marketed to law enforcement agencies, the military and other security providers. The system is operated and aimed with a joystick and aiming screen. The device can be used for targets over 250 metres (820 ft) away, and the beam has a power of 30 kilowatts.

On August 20, 2010, the Los Angeles Sheriff's Department announced its intent to use this technology within the United States to control incarcerated people in the Pitchess Detention Center in Los Angeles, stating its intent to use it in "operational evaluation" in situations such as breaking up prisoner fights. The Los Angeles County Jail installed the smaller-sized unit, under the name Assault Intervention Device, on the ceiling of the Pitchess Detention Center in 2014.

== See also ==
- Area denial weapons, to prevent an adversary from occupying or traversing an area
- Heat Ray
- Long-range acoustic device
- MEDUSA (weapon)
- Radiation
