= Treatment of infections after exposure to ionizing radiation =

Infections caused by exposure to ionizing radiation can be extremely dangerous, and are of public and government concern. Numerous studies have demonstrated that the susceptibility of organisms to systemic infection increased following exposure to ionizing radiation. The risk of systemic infection is higher when the organism has a combined injury, such as a conventional blast, thermal burn, or radiation burn. There is a direct quantitative relationship between the magnitude of the neutropenia that develops after exposure to radiation and the increased risk of developing infection. Because no controlled studies of therapeutic intervention in humans are available, almost all of the current information is based on animal research.

== Cause of infection ==
Infections caused by ionizing radiation can be endogenous, originating from the oral and gastrointestinal bacterial flora, and exogenous, originating from breached skin following trauma.

The organisms causing endogenous infections are generally gram negative bacilli such as Enterobacteriaceae (i.e. Escherichia coli, Klebsiella pneumoniae, Proteus spp. ), and Pseudomonas aeruginosa.

Exposure to higher doses of radiation is associated with systemic anaerobic infections due to gram negative bacilli and gram positive cocci. Fungal infections can also emerge in those that fail antimicrobial therapy and stay febrile for over 7–10 days.

Exogenous infections can be caused by organisms that colonize the skin such as Staphylococcus aureus or Streptococcus spp. and organisms that are acquired from the environment such as Pseudomonas spp.

Organisms causing sepsis following exposure to ionizing radiation:

-	Endogenous	Exogenous
Low doses	Staphylococcus spp. Enterobacteriaceae (Klebsiella spp., E coli)	None currently known
High doses	Fungi, Anaerobic bacteria	Pseudomonas aeruginosa, Klebsiella pneumoniae

== Principles of treatment ==
The management of established or suspected infection following exposure to radiation (characterized by neutropenia and fever) is similar to that used for other febrile neutropenic patients. However, important differences between the two conditions exist. The patient that develops neutropenia after radiation is susceptible to irradiation damage to other tissues, such as the gastrointestinal tract, lungs and the central nervous system. These patients may require therapeutic interventions not needed in other types of neutropenic infections. The response of irradiated animals to antimicrobial therapy is sometimes unpredictable, as was evident in experimental studies where metronidazole and pefloxacin therapies were detrimental.

Antimicrobial agents that decrease the number of the strict anaerobic component of the gut flora (i.e., metronidazole) generally should not be given because they may enhance systemic infection by aerobic or facultative bacteria, thus facilitating mortality after irradiation.

== Choice of antimicrobials ==
An empirical regimen of antibiotics should be selected, based on the pattern of bacterial susceptibility and nosocomial infections in the particular area and institution and the degree of neutropenia. Broad-spectrum empirical therapy (see below for choices) with high doses of one or more antibiotics should be initiated at the onset of fever. These antimicrobials should be directed at the eradication of Gram-negative aerobic organisms (i.e. Enterobacteriaceae, Pseudomonas ) that account for more than three-fourths of the isolates causing sepsis. Because aerobic and facultative Gram-positive bacteria (mostly alpha-hemolytic streptococci) cause sepsis in about a quarter of the victims, coverage for these organisms may be necessary in the rest of the individuals.

A standardized plan for the management of febrile, neutropenic patients must be devised in each institution or agency. Empirical regimens must contain antibiotics broadly active against Gram-negative aerobic bacteria (a quinolone such as ciprofloxacin or levofloxacin, a fourth-generation cephalosporins such as cefepime or ceftazidime, or an aminoglycoside such as gentamicin or amikacin]. Antibiotics directed against Gram-positive bacteria need to be included in instances and institutions where infections due to these organisms are prevalent. ( amoxicillin, vancomycin, or linezolid).

These are the antimicrobial agents that can be used for therapy of infection following exposure to irradiation:

a. First choice: ciprofloxacin (a second-generation quinolone) or levofloxacin (a third-generation quinolone) +/- amoxicillin or vancomycin. Ciprofloxacin is effective against Gram-negative organisms (including Pseudomonas species) but has poor coverage for Gram-positive organisms (including Staphylococcus aureus and Streptococcus pneumoniae) and some atypical pathogens. Levofloxacin has expanded Gram-positive coverage (penicillin-sensitive and penicillin-resistant S. pneumoniae) and expanded activity against atypical pathogens.

b. Second choice: ceftriaxone (a third-generation cephalosporin) or cefepime (a fourth-generation cephalosporin) +/- amoxicillin or vancomycin. Cefepime exhibits an extended spectrum of activity for Gram-positive bacteria (staphylococci) and Gram-negative organisms, including Pseudomonas aeruginosa and certain Enterobacteriaceae that generally are resistant to most third-generation cephalosporins. Cefepime is an injectable and is not available in an oral form.

c. Third choice: gentamicin or amikacin (both aminoglycosides) +/- amoxicillin or vancomycin (all injectable). Aminoglycosides should be avoided whenever feasible due to associated toxicities.

The second and third choices of antimicrobials are suitable for children because quinolones are not approved for use in this age group.

Antimicrobial Therapy for Sepsis after Irradiation (Duration 21–28 days)
• Quinolones, 2nd or 3rd generation

– Ciprofloxacin (2nd) or Levofloxacin (3rd)

• Cephalosporins, 3rd or 4th generation

– Ceftriaxone (3rd) or Cefepime (4th)

• Aminoglycosides

– Gentamicin or Amikacin

• ± Amoxicillin or Vancomycin
• ± Amphotericin B (persistent fever 7 days on Rx)

The use of these agents should be considered in individuals exposed to doses above 1.5 Gy, should be given to those who develop fever and neutropenia and should be administered within 48 hours of exposure. An estimation of the exposure dose should be done by biological dosimetry whenever possible and by detailed history of exposure.

If infection is documented by cultures, the empirical regimen may require adjustment to provide appropriate coverage for the specific isolate(s). When the patient remains afebrile, the initial regimen should be continued for a minimum of 7 days. Therapy may need to be continued for at least 21–28 days or until the risk of infection has declined because of recovery of the immune system. A mass casualty situation may mandate the use of oral antimicrobials.

== Modification of therapy ==
Modifications of this initial antibiotic regimen should be made when microbiological culture shows specific bacteria that are resistant to the initial antimicrobials. The modification, if needed, should be influenced by a thorough evaluation of the history, physical examination findings, laboratory data, chest radiograph, and epidemiological information. Antifungal coverage with amphotericin B may need to be added.

If diarrhea is present, cultures of stool should be examined for enteropathogens (i.e., Salmonella, Shigella, Campylobacter, and Yersinia). Oral and pharyngeal mucositis and esophagitis suggest Herpes simplex infection or candidiasis. Either empirical antiviral or antifungal therapy or both should be considered.

In addition to infections due to neutropenia, a patient with the Acute Radiation Syndrome will also be at risk for viral, fungal and parasitic infections. If these types of infection are suspected, cultures should be performed and appropriate medication started if indicated.
