= Microwave burn =

Burn caused by microwave radiation

Microwave burns are burn injuries caused by thermal effects of microwave radiation absorbed in a living organism.

In comparison with radiation burns caused by ionizing radiation, where the dominant mechanism of tissue damage is internal cell damage caused by free radicals, the type of burn caused by microwave radiation is by heat—health effects colloquially associated with the term "radiation", such as radiation poisoning, cannot be caused by exposure to microwaves or other forms of non-ionizing radiation.

Microwave damage can manifest with a delay; pain or signs of skin damage can show some time after microwave exposure.

== Frequency and depth ==
The depth of penetration depends on the frequency of the microwaves and the tissue type. The Active Denial System ("pain ray") is a less-lethal directed energy weapon that employs a microwave beam at 95 GHz; a two-second burst of the 95 GHz focused beam heats the skin to a temperature of 130 °F (54 °C) at a depth of 1/64th of an inch (0.4 mm) and is claimed to cause skin pain without lasting damage. Conversely, lower frequencies penetrate deeper; at 5.8 GHz (3.2 mm) the depth most of the energy is dissipated in the first millimeter of the skin; the 2.45 GHz frequency microwaves commonly used in microwave ovens can deliver energy deeper into the tissue; the generally accepted value is 17 mm for muscle tissue.

As lower frequencies penetrate deeper into the tissue, and as there are fewer nerve endings in deeper-located parts of the body, the effects of the radio frequency waves (and the damage caused) may not be immediately noticeable. The lower frequencies at high power densities present a significant risk.

The microwave absorption is directed by the dielectric constant of the tissue. At 2.5 GHz, this ranges from about 5 for adipose tissue to about 56 for cardiac muscle. As the speed of electromagnetic waves is proportional to the reciprocal of the square root of the dielectric constant, the resulting wavelength in the tissue can drop to a fraction of the wavelength in air; e.g. at 10 GHz the wavelength can drop from 3 cm to about 3.4 mm.

The layers of the body can be approximated as a thin layer of epidermis, dermis, adipose tissue (subcutaneous fat), and muscle tissue. At dozens of gigahertz, the radiation is absorbed in the top fraction to top few millimeters of skin. Muscle tissue is a much more efficient absorber than fat, so at lower frequencies that can penetrate sufficiently deep, most energy gets deposited there. In a homogeneous medium, the energy-depth dependence is an exponential curve with the exponent depending on the frequency and tissue. For 2.5 GHz, the first millimeter of muscle tissue absorbs 11% of the heat energy, the first two millimeters together absorb 20%. For lower frequencies, the attenuation factors are much lower, the achievable heating depths are higher, and the temperature gradient within the tissue is lower.

== Tissue damage ==
The tissue damage depends primarily on the absorbed energy and the tissue sensitivity; it is a function of the microwave power density (which depends on the distance from the source and its power output), frequency, absorption rate in the given tissue, and the tissue sensitivity. Tissues with high water (respectively electrolyte) content show higher microwave absorption.

The degree of the tissue damage depends on both the achieved temperature and the length of exposure. For short times, higher temperatures can be tolerated.

The damage can be spread over a large area, when the source is a relatively distant energy radiator, or a very small (though possibly deep) area, when the body comes to a direct contact with the source (e.g. a wire or a connector pin).

The epidermis has high electrical resistance for lower frequencies; at higher frequencies, the energy penetrates through by capacitive coupling. Damage to epidermis has low extent unless the epidermis is very moist. The characteristic depth for lower-frequency microwave injury is about 1 cm. The heating rate of adipose tissue is much lower than that of muscle tissue. Frequencies in millimeter wave range are absorbed in the topmost layer of skin, which is rich in thermal sensors. At lower frequencies, between 1–10 GHz, most of the energy is however absorbed in deeper layers; the threshold for cellular injury there lies at 42 °C while the pain threshold is at 45 °C, so a subjective perception may not be a reliable indicator of a harmful level of exposure at those frequencies.

=== Skin ===
Exposure to frequencies common in domestic and industrial sources rarely leads to significant skin damage; in such cases, the damage tends to be limited to upper limbs. Significant injury with erythema, blisters, pain, nerve damage and tissue necrosis can occur even with exposures as short as 2–3 seconds. Due to the deep penetration of these frequencies, the skin may be minimally affected and show no signs of damage, while muscles, nerves, and blood vessels may be significantly damaged.

=== Muscle and fat tissue ===
Microwave burns show some similarities with electrical burns, as the tissue damage is deep rather than superficial. Adipose tissue shows less degree of damage than muscles and other water-rich tissues. (In contrast, radiant heat, contact burns and chemical burns damage subcutaneous adipose tissue to higher extent than deeper muscle tissue.) Full-thickness biopsy of the area between burned and unburned skin shows layers of more and less damaged tissue (tissue sparing), layers of undamaged fat between damaged muscles; a pattern that is not present in conventional thermal or chemical burns. Cells subjected to electrical burns show microscopic nuclear streaming on histology examination; this feature is not present with microwave burns. Microwaves also deposit more energy to areas with low blood supply and to tissue interfaces.

Hot spots may be formed in the tissue, with a consequent higher absorption of microwave energy and even higher temperature achieved, with localized necrosis of the affected tissue following. Sometimes, the affected tissue can even be charred.

Muscle tissue destruction can lead to myoglobinuria, with renal failure following in severe cases; this is similar to burns from electric current. Urinalysis and serum CPK, BUN and creatine tests are used to check for this condition.

=== Eyes ===
Cases of severe conjunctivitis were reported after technicians looked into powered waveguides.

Microwave-induced cataracts have been reported. Experiments on rabbits and dogs, mostly in the UHF range of frequencies, shown that the ocular effects are confined to eyelids and conjunctiva (as e.g. anterior segment keratitis or iritis). Cataracts were observed at several workers exposed to radiofrequency radiation, but in some of the cases the cause was unrelated to the RF exposure and in the other cases the evidence was incomplete or inconclusive. Some sources however mention incidence of microwave-related injuries of ocular lens and retina and the possibility of thermal effects to cause cataracts or focal tissue burns (including keratitis).

For the near field 2.45 GHz frequency, the minimum power density to cause cataracts in rabbits was found to be 150 mW/cm^{2} for 100 minutes; a retrolental temperature of 41 °C was necessary to be achieved. When the eye temperature was kept low by external cooling, cataracts were not produced by higher field intensities; that supports the hypothesis of a thermal mechanism being involved.

=== Nerves ===
Sensory nerves are particularly sensitive to microwave damage. Cases of persistent neuritis and compression neuropathy were reported after significant microwave exposures.

When the temperature of the brain is raised to or above 42 °C, the blood–brain barrier permeability increases.

A neuropathy due to peripheral nerve lesion, without visible external burns, can occur when the nerve is subjected to microwaves of sufficient power density. The damage mechanism is believed to be thermal. Radiofrequency waves and ultrasound can be used for temporary blocking of peripheral nerves during neurosurgical operations.

=== Other tissues ===
The thermal effects of microwaves can cause testicular degeneration and lower sperm count.

Pulmonary burn can be present when lungs are exposed; chest radiography is used for diagnosing.

Exposure of abdomen may lead to bowel obstruction due to stenosis of the affected bowel; flat and upright abdominal radiography is used to check for this condition.

== Injury cases ==
Household microwave ovens have shielding around the inside of the oven that prevents microwaves from leaking out, as well as safety interlocks that prevent the oven from operating when the door is open. Therefore, burns due to direct exposure to microwave energy (as opposed to touching hot food) should not occur under normal circumstances.

=== Infants and microwave ovens ===
There are several cases of child abuse where an infant or child has been placed in a microwave oven. The typical feature of such injuries are well-defined burns on the skin nearest to the microwave emitter, and histology examination shows higher damage extent in tissues with high content of water (e.g., muscles) than in tissues with less water (e.g., adipose tissue).

One such case involved a teenage babysitter who admitted to having placed a child in the microwave oven for approximately sixty seconds. The child developed a third degree burn to the back, measuring 5 inches x 6 inches. The babysitter later took the child to the emergency department, where multiple skin grafts were placed on the back. There were no signs of lasting emotional, cognitive or physical effects. CT scan of the head was normal, and there were no cataracts.

Another case involved a five-week-old female infant that had multiple full-thickness burns totaling 11% of the body surface area. The mother claimed the infant had been near a microwave oven, but not inside it. The infant survived but required amputations of parts of one leg and one hand.

Additionally, there have been two alleged infant deaths caused by microwave ovens. In all these cases, the babies were placed within microwaves and died of subsequent injuries.

=== Adults and microwave ovens ===
A case of nerve damage by an exposure to radiation from a malfunctioning 600 watt microwave oven, operated for five seconds with the door open, with both arms and hands exposed, was reported. During exposure, there was a pulsating, burning sensation in all fingers. Erythema appeared on the back sides of both hands and arms. Four years later, denervation of median nerve, ulnar nerve, and radial nerve in both arms was shown on an electromyography test.

The first microwave oven injury was reported in 1973. Two women operated a microwave oven in a department store snack bar. After several years, the oven showed a malfunction manifesting by burning the food. The first woman noticed burning sensations in her fingers and very little pain or tenderness when nearby to the operating oven. A small lesion appeared on her left index finger, near the base of the fingernail. In the next four weeks, three fingers of her right hand became affected as well. Transverse ridging and deformations close to the nail base appeared on her fingernails. After five months since the initial symptoms, she visited a doctor; the examination found no abnormalities other than the nails. Topical steroid cream used over six weeks led to gradual improvement. The second woman experienced nail deformation at the same time as the first one, with the same clinical findings. The oven was returned to the manufacturer before the involvement of the doctor, and the amount of leakage could not be assessed.

On July 29, 1977, H.F., a 51-year-old teacher, was attempting to remove a casserole dish from her new 600-watt microwave oven. The oven signaled the end of the heating cycle, but the light and the cooking blower were on. During retrieval of the dish, she inserted two thirds of her bare forearms into the oven, for a total time of about five seconds. The oven was still operating. She felt "hot pulsating sensation" and burning in fingers and fingernails and a sensation of "needles" over the exposed areas. Jabbing pain, swelling, and red-orange discoloration of dorsal sides of both hands and forearms appeared shortly afterwards. The next day she sought medical help. Since then, she has undergone treatment with oral and topical cortisone, Grenz rays, ultrasound, and later acupuncture, without relief. Symptoms persisted, including high sensitivity to radiant heat (sun, desk lamp, etc.) and growing intolerance to pressure of clothes and to touch in hands and forearms. Neurological examinations in 1980 and 1981 did not yield a definite diagnosis. Neuronal latencies were within norm. Electromyography discovered denervation in the median nerve, ulnar nerve, and radial nerve on both arms. Severe reduction of number of sweat glands in the finger pulps, in comparison with a random control, was also found. The injury was determined to be caused by the full power of the magnetron; the pulsating sensation was caused either by the stirrer (a mechanical mirror distributing the microwave beam across the oven space to prevent formation of hot and cold spots), or by the arterial pulsation in combination with increased nerve sensitivity. Damage to the A beta fibers, A delta fibers, and group C nerve fibers was the cause of the burning sensation. The increased hypersensitivity to radiant heat is caused by the damage to the A beta, A delta, and polymodal nociceptors (the group C fibers); this damage is induced by a single-time overheating of the skin to 48.5–50 °C, and the resulting sensitivity persists for a long time. Degeneration of the alpha motor neurons is also caused by the exposure to heat and radiation. Most of the major nerve trunks were not affected. Damage to the A beta fibers (located in the skin), discovered by the two-point discrimination test, is permanent; the Pacinian corpuscles, Meissner corpuscles, and Merkel nerve endings, which degenerated after denervation, do not regenerate. The sympathetic nervous system was involved as well; the reduction in active sweat glands was caused by destruction of their innervation, the initial edema and reddening was also caused by sympathetic nerve damage.

In 1983, a 35-year-old male was heating a sandwich in a microwave oven at work. After opening the door, the magnetron did not shut off and his right hand was exposed to microwave radiation as he retrieved the sandwich. After exposure, his hand was pale and cold; 30 minutes later the man presented himself to a doctor, with paresthesia in all fingers and the hand still pale and cold. An Allen's test showed a return to normal color after 60 seconds (normal is 5 seconds). By 60 minutes after exposure the hand was normal again, and the patient was discharged without treatment. A week later there was no paresthesia, motor weakness nor sensory deficit.

=== Other ===
An engineer replaced a woodpecker-damaged feed horn of a high-power microwave antenna, a 15-meter dish at an Earth station of a television network, using a cherry picker. After finishing, he sent his technician to power up the transmitter, and attempted to lower the cherry picker down. The engine failed and the engineer was stuck next to the antenna, outside of its main lobe but well within the first sidelobe. The technician, unaware that the engineer was still close to the antenna, powered it up. The engineer was exposed to an intense microwave field for about three minutes, until the error was realized. There were no immediate symptoms; the next morning the engineer detected blood and solid matter in his urine, and visited a doctor, who found blood in stool and massive bowel adhesions. The engineer's medical problems lasted for many years.

== Medical uses ==
Dielectric heating (diathermy) is used in medicine; the frequencies used typically lie in the ultrasonic, shortwave, and microwave ranges. Careless application, especially when the patient has implanted metal conductors (e.g. cardiostimulator leads), can cause burns of skin and deeper tissues and even death.

Microwave damage to tissues can be intentionally exploited as a therapeutic technique, e.g. radiofrequency ablation and radiofrequency lesioning. Controlled destruction of tissue is performed for treatment of arrhythmia. Microwave coagulation can be used for some kinds of surgeries, e.g., stopping bleeding after a severe liver injury.

Microwave heating seems to cause more damage to bacteria than equivalent thermal-only heating. However food reheated in a microwave oven typically reaches lower temperature than classically reheated, therefore pathogens are more likely to survive.

Microwave heating of blood, e.g. for transfusion, is contraindicated, as it can cause hemolysis and hyperkalemia.

Microwave heating is one of the methods for inducing hyperthermia for hyperthermia therapy.

High-energy microwaves are used in neurobiology experiments to kill small laboratory animals (mice, rats) in order to fix brain metabolites without the loss of anatomical integrity of the tissue. The instruments used are designed to focus most of the power to the animal's head. The unconsciousness and death is nearly instant, occurring in less than one second, and the method is the most efficient one to fix brain tissue chemical activity. A 2.45 GHz, 6.5 kW source will heat the brain of a 30 g mouse to 90 °C in about 325 milliseconds; a 915 MHz, 25 kW source will heat the brain of a 300 g rat to the same temperature in a second. Special devices designed or modified for this purpose have to be used; use of kitchen-grade microwave ovens is condemned.

== Perception thresholds ==
Safety limits exist for microwave exposure. The U.S. Occupational Safety and Health Administration defines energy density limit for exposure periods of 0.1 hours or more to 10 mW/cm^{2}; for shorter periods the limit is 1 mW-hr/cm^{2} with limited excursions above 10 mW/cm^{2}. The U.S. Food and Drug Administration (FDA) standard for microwave oven leakage puts limit to 5 mW/cm^{2} at 2 inches from the oven's surface.

For 5.8 GHz, exposure to 30 mW/cm^{2} causes increase of facial skin temperature by 0.48 °C, corneal surface heats by 0.7 °C, and the temperature of retina is estimated to increase by 0.08–0.03 °C.

Exposure of skin to microwaves can be perceived as a sensation of heat or pain. Due to lower penetration of higher frequencies, perception threshold is lower for higher frequencies as more energy is dissipated closer to the body surface. When the entire face is exposed to 10 GHz microwaves, the feeling of heat is evoked at energy densities of 4–6 mW/cm^{2} for 5 or more seconds, or about 10 mW/cm^{2} for a half second. Experiments on six volunteers exposed to 2.45 GHz microwaves shown perception thresholds on forearm skin to be at the average of 25–29 mW/cm^{2}, ranging from 15.40 to 44.25 mW/cm^{2}. The sensation was indistinguishable from heat delivered by infrared radiation, though the infrared radiation required about five times lower energy density. Pain threshold for 3 GHz was demonstrated to range from 0.83 to 3.1 W/cm^{2} for 9.5 cm^{2} of exposed area, depending on length of the exposure; other source says the dependence is not directly on the power density and exposure length, but primarily on the critical skin temperature.

Microwave energy can be focused by metal objects in the vicinity of the body or when implanted. Such focusing and resultant increased heating can significantly lower the perception, pain and damage thresholds. Metal-framed glasses perturb microwave fields between 2–12 GHz; individual components were found to be resonant between 1.4 and 3.75 GHz.

A security guard with a metal plate in his leg experienced heating of the plate when patrolling near tropospheric scatter transmitter antennas; he had to be removed from their vicinity.

In the 30–300 GHz band, dry clothing may serve as an impedance transformer, facilitating more efficient energy coupling to the underlying skin.

Pulsed microwave radiation can be perceived by some workers as a phenomenon called "microwave hearing"; the irradiated personnel perceive auditory sensations of clicking or buzzing. The cause is thought to be thermoelastic expansion of portions of auditory apparatus. The auditory system response occurs at least from 200 MHz to at least 3 GHz. In the tests, repetition rate of 50 Hz was used, with pulse width between 10 and 70 microseconds. The perceived loudness was found to be linked to the peak power density instead of average power density. At 1.245 GHz, the peak power density for perception was below 80 mW/cm^{2}. The generally accepted mechanism is rapid (but minuscule, in the range of 10^{−5} °C) heating of brain by each pulse, and the resulting pressure wave traveling through skull to cochlea.

== Other concerns ==
Some vacuum tubes present in microwave installations tend to generate bremsstrahlung x-rays. Magnetrons and especially hydrogen thyratrons tend to be the worst offenders.

== Low-level exposure ==
As the energy of radio frequency waves and microwaves is insufficient to directly disrupt individual chemical bonds in small or stable molecules, the effects are considered limited to thermal. Energy densities that are not sufficient to overheat the tissues are not shown to cause lasting damage. To clarify, the deep-red lightbulb in a black-and-white photographic darkroom produces a higher-energy form of radiation than microwaves. Like a microwave, this lightbulb can burn, particularly if touched, but the burn is only possible due to too much heat. A study of 20,000 radar technicians of the US Navy, who were chronically exposed to high levels of microwave radiation, did not detect increased incidence of cancer. Recent epidemiologic evidence also led to the consensus that exposure to electromagnetic fields, e.g. along power lines, did not raise incidence of leukemia or other cancers.

== Myths ==
A common myth among radar and microwave communication workers is that the exposure of the genital area to microwaves renders a man sterile for about a day. The power density necessary for this effect is however sufficient to also cause permanent damage.
