= Genasys =

American technology company

Genasys Inc.
- Type: Public
- Traded as: Nasdaq: GNSS
- Industry: Technology/Manufacturing
- Founded: 1980; 46 years ago in Utah, U.S.
- Founder: Elwood Norris
- Headquarters: San Diego, California, U.S.
- Area served: Worldwide
- Key people: Richard S. Danforth (CEO); Cassandra Monteon (CFO); William Dodd (Chairman)
- Products: Genasys Protect; Acoustics; Evertel; Long Range Acoustic Devices; LRAD 100X; LRAD 450XL-RT; LRAD 500X MMT; LRAD 500X-RT; LRAD 950NXT; LRAD 1000Xi-RT; LRAD 1950XL-RT; LRAD 2000X
- Website: genasys.com

Genasys Inc. is based in San Diego, California. Its long-range acoustic device (LRAD) products are used for long-range acoustic hailing and mass notification. Its software-as-a-service products Genasys Protect and Evertel are used for zone-based multi-channel communication and secure messaging and collaboration, respectively. Genasys Acoustics are integrated speakers used to send long range voice broadcasts. The company was previously named American Technology Corporation (ATC) until 2010 and LRAD Corporation until 2019. The company's stock trades on the NASDAQ Capital Market with the ticker symbol "GNSS".

== History ==
Genasys was founded in Utah by Elwood "Woody" Norris as the American Technology Corporation in 1980. From 1988 to early 1992 the company was inactive. Norris recapitalized the company as a Delaware Corporation in 1992. In 1996, the company launched its first directed sound technology and began engineering sound solutions for the commercial, government, and military markets.

In response to the October 2000 attack on the USS Cole, the company's engineering team developed their long-range acoustic device (LRAD) product line. With the introduction of LRAD systems in 2003, the company created the acoustic hailing device (AHD) market, followed by the introduction of multidirectional mass notifications systems in 2012.

The company acquired Genasys, a Madrid, Spain-based software provider of location-based mass messaging solutions for emergency warning and workforce management in January 2018, and subsequently adopted the name Genasys for itself.

In 2020, Genasys acquired Amika Mobile, an Ottawa, Canada-based enterprise software provider of critical event situational awareness, communication and control products. It was subsequently renamed Genasys Communications Canada. In a June 2021 acquisition, Genasys added Zonehaven, a California-based company specializing in emergency evacuation software services and resources.

In May 2021, the Greek police held a press call which showed them using a Genasys LRAD 450XL to deter migrants from entering at the border. The European Union has expressed concern over Greece's use of the technology and whether it contravenes the European Union's laws on fundamental rights.

In September 2023, Genasys acquired Evertel Technologies from Word Systems Operations for about $5.8 million.

Los Angeles County suspended use of Genasys during the January 2025 Southern California wildfires after an "alert was erroneously sent out to nearly 10 million residents". The County resumed use of Genasys later that month.

After San Diego County implemented Genasys in 2024, the technology was used by the county and City of San Diego in January 2025 to safely evacuate residents from wildfires.

In 2025, LRAD was referenced in a controversy surrounding the alleged use of Long-range acoustic devices by law enforcement as a weapon during anti-corruption protests on March 15 in Belgrade, Serbia. In a social media post, Genasys claimed that evidence they had seen did not point directly to the involvement of their devices, however purchase reporting suggestions their technology was installed on law enforcement vehicles present at the protests.

The Maui Emergency Management Agency launched Genasys on May 1, 2025, to enhance emergency operations and evacuations for residents and visitors on Maui, Molokai and Lanai.

In June 2025, Santa Barbara County began using Genasys Protect mapping software to assist first responders and county residents during evacuations and other emergencies.

The City of San Jose, California implemented Genasys Protect hours before the Ranch Fire started in the East San Jose hills June 17, 2025.

== Products ==
- Genasys Protect - Zone-based communication and targeted multi-channel alerting software. Genasys Protect is used to help alert in harm's way quickly with targeted geographical zones, tested evacuation plans, and consistent communication during and after a critical event The State of New Hampshire selected Genasys to send emergency and non-emergency notifications through single or multiple communication methods to keep residents and visitors informed public safety messaging and severe weather-related notifications. The State of Oregon's Office of Resilience and Emergency Management entered into a multi-year contract with Genasys to provide emergency response planning and evacuation management.
- Acoustics The City of Berkeley introduced a new outdoor warning system to alert people of wildfires and other critical events. The system includes 15 Acoustics outdoor speakers installed on buildings throughout Berkeley. The Acoustics systems broadcast siren tones, audible warnings and voice instructions.
- Evertel Evertel provides secure, real-time communication and collaboration for public safety agencies, financial services, and secure business communication.
- Long Range Acoustic Device (LRAD), is a directional acoustic system designed for long-range communication and mass notification.
