= Long-range acoustic device =

High-powered loudspeaker

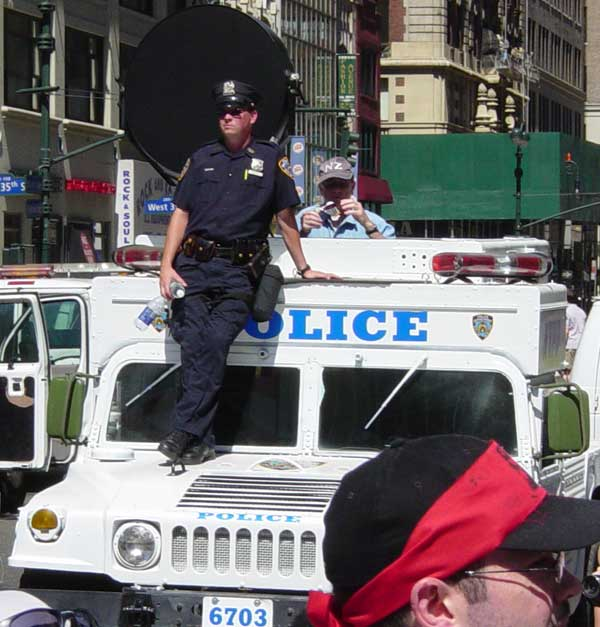
An NYPD LRAD on top of a police humvee outside the 2004 Republican National Convention, hosted in Madison Square Garden in New York City

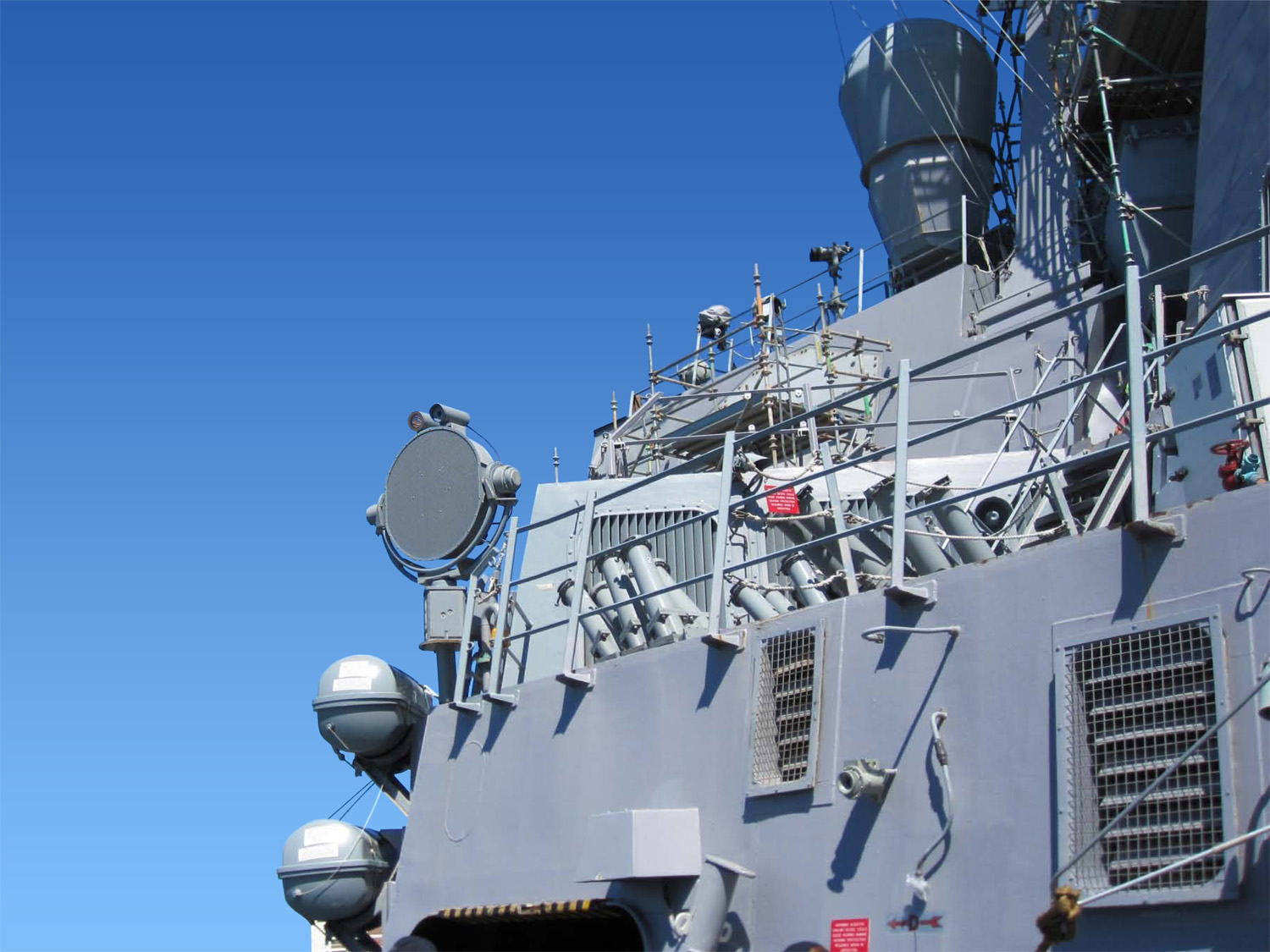
US Navy Ship with LRAD system aboard, 2010

A long-range acoustic device (LRAD), acoustic hailing device (AHD), or sound cannon is a specialized loudspeaker and sound weapon that produces sound at high power for communicating at a distance. It has been used as a method of crowd control, which has historically been known to cause permanent hearing damage over long periods, having an extremely high decibel capacity (up to 160 dB measured at one meter from the device). Other uses have included for negotiations in siege situations; to deal with piracy at sea; for mass notification during natural disasters or other emergencies; and by the military, including several navies.

== Overview ==
Acoustic hailing devices are acoustic devices capable of outputting intelligible sound at very high volumes. The distance at which acoustic hailing can be effective varies based on several factors including the sound level, directionality, and frequency of the acoustic source, the sensitivity and directionality of the receiver, and the transmission channel environment. The sound level diminishes or attenuates with distance. Consequently, as a general rule, higher source levels have greater range.

Acoustic hailing devices can come in two forms:

1. Directional models: These AHDs are characterized by their ability to create long-range, directional voice communications and warning tones. Their directionality is typically 5° to 60° radius conical at a 2 kHz tone.
2. Omnidirectional models: These acoustic hailing devices are capable of creating 360° voice communications and warning tones. These devices are capable of being heard over 2.4 kilometres (1.5 mi) away from the emitter head.

=== Origin ===
The term acoustic hailing device came into common use following the suicide attack on the USS Cole while it was at a port in Yemen in 2000. Following this attack, the United States Navy established a requirement for an acoustic hailing device. The intent of this AHD was to provide the Navy with a means to establish the intent of an approaching vessel at a distance such that defensive measures could be taken should the vessel not heed a warning. One unique aspect of this requirement was that the sound needed to be focused so that it could be clearly directed at the approaching vessel.

=== Present ===
Since their inception in 2002, acoustic hailing devices have grown into a variety of applications. AHD uses include checkpoints, crowd control, maritime shipping, mass notification, early warning systems, critical infrastructure protection, military applications, and wildlife protection and control. Acoustic hailing devices are now fielded all over the world by various commercial, law enforcement, and military groups.

== History ==
In October 2000 the USS Cole, an American guided missile destroyer, was bombed in an attack by al-Qaeda operatives, using a small boat packed with explosives. The naval personnel on Cole were unable to be sure that their messages could be heard by the approaching boat at a sufficient distance to possibly avert the attack. The ship was badly damaged, with 17 U.S. Navy sailors killed and 37 injured.

Following this attack, navies around the world made several policy changes, while the American Technology Corporation (which was rebranded to LRAD Corporation in 2010 and to Genasys in late October 2019) created and developed the AHD market, which included the launch of its proprietary Long Range Acoustic Device, a type of acoustic hailing device, in 2003. Using this new technology, it became possible for naval personnel to contact approaching vessels which did not respond to radio calls from a distance of over 3,000 metres (9,800 ft), enabling them to respond appropriately in a timely manner and avert danger.

Since then the technology has developed and expanded. Genasys launched its voice-based mass notification systems in 2012, and in 2019 its unified multichannel Critical Communications and Enterprise Safety system.

LRADs have become widely used for communications, and increasingly for crowd control in a range of settings, including civil disturbances and protests.

== Characteristics and measurements ==
Acoustic hailing devices differ from conventional speaker systems in three key ways: volume, clarity, and directionality. AHD manufacturers use different methods to measure their products, but a common standard has emerged.

=== Volume ===
Since sound attenuates with distance, extremely high outputs are required to achieve the required range. Acoustic hailing devices have an output of 135 decibels (dB) or greater. The acoustic level of the source is commonly expressed in terms of sound pressure level or SPL. SPL is a logarithmic measure of the rms sound pressure of a sound relative to a reference value. It is measured in decibels (dB) above a standard reference level. For reference, at a distance of 1 meter, a normal talking voice is approximately 50 dB and a jet engine at 30 meters is 150 dB.

=== Clarity ===
A principal weakness of common speaker systems and bullhorns is their clarity. Their horns and cones create sound that is distorted or out of phase. This results in the common "Charlie Brown" effect, where the message is muffled and misunderstood, analogous to the muted brass squawks representing the unintelligible voices of adults in animated Peanuts specials. AHDs create sound that is in phase. Because of this, sound emitted from acoustic hailing devices is intelligible at distance. Clarity is difficult to measure, since it is a subjective reference. However, different scales have been created to compare devices. A common measurement is the speech transmission index (STI). STI ratings range from 0–1.0, with 1.0 being perfect clarity.

=== Focus ===
AHDs are lastly characterized by directionality. To ensure messages are broadcast to the target, AHDs shape sound into a 30–60° audio beam. This shaping is accomplished through the design of the transducers as well as various reflective horns. The focus of an AHD is typically measured at the frequency of peak directionality. This is typically in the 1–2 kHz range. Not all frequencies of sound are able to be directed equally. Lower frequencies in the bass range are difficult to form. As such, their directionality may be a 40 degree radius or more depending on the design of the AHD.

== Specifications and functionality ==
LRADs are made by Genasys. As of 2022, the company claims its LRAD products meet the following specifications:

- 30° audible transmission ranges out to 5,000 meters
- 60º–360° audible mass notification coverage over areas up to 14 km^{2} (5.4 sq mi)

LRADs include hand-held devices, as well as those mounted on helicopters, motor vehicles and ships.

The parameter "ka", which is the wave number multiplied by the speaker radius, is often used to characterize sound source directivity. For this source, ka=19 at 2.5 kHz, and according to the LRAD data sheet, the beam angle of about 30 degrees total is what is predicted for a regular loudspeaker.

Small spherical "point-source" acoustic devices follow the known inverse square law, which predicts the loss of 6 decibels (dB) per doubling of distance from the source, solely due to geometric spreading. Large speakers (or large arrays), such as these, have an interference pattern in the nearfield which produces peaks 6 dB higher than the output pressure and nulls where the pressure is essentially zero. The larger the speaker, and the higher the frequency, the longer the effective nearfield. The nearfield for this device is approximately 8 metres (26 ft). An LRAD can thus emit a targeted "beam" of sound at very high volume, up to 160 dB at one meter from the device. This is louder than standing behind a jet engine taking off, or a nearby gunshot.

== Use ==
Following the impetus for its initial development, 25 navies have adopted the use of LRADs as of 2022, to provide protection for their vessels. Navy personnel can contact approaching vessels from over 3,000 m (9,800 ft) and respond defensively if necessary. They are also used by coast guards, naval bases, commercial vessels, and in ports.

Genasys offers its products for the following categories of use on its U.S. website: defense, law enforcement, fire and rescue services, border security, protection of critical infrastructure, and maritime safety. As of 2022 its products are in use in 100 countries. The Asia-Pacific website is focused on emergency management during natural disasters such as bushfires. It is not categorized as a defense item, and does not require an export license.

The technology can also be used to deter wildlife from airport runways, as at Changi Airport in Singapore, and to protect gas and oil platforms from fishing boats, birds and security threats.

There are two basic ways of using LRADs: for voice amplification and as an alert. The technology used in "siren mode" (called an "alert tone" by Genasys), primarily for usage in emergency situations, has also been used for crowd control. In this mode, it allows sound transmission at around 2,000–4,000 Hertz, which causes maximum discomfort for the people targeted, as this is the frequency range at human hearing is most sensitive. Although sometimes referred to as an Active Denial System, the latter is based on a different technology, in which millimetre-wave radiation causes nerve receptors in the skin to feel heat, via dielectric heating.

== Risks ==
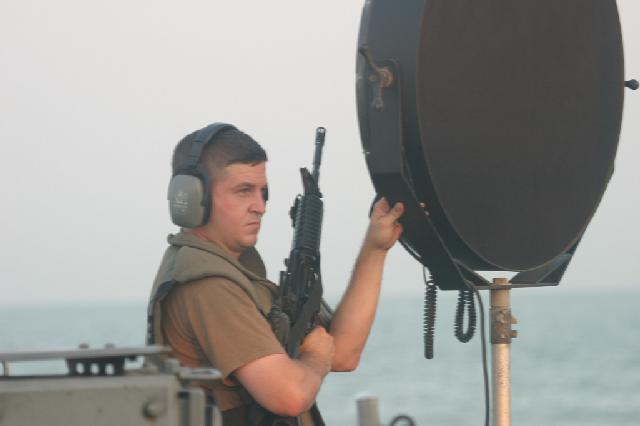
An LRAD operator wearing hearing protection

Acoustic hailing devices are being used as weapons. The human ear can typically stand a sound pressure level of 120 dB before feeling pain. AHDs are capable of 135 dB or more of acoustic energy. OSHA states that any sound pressure level over 90 dB requires hearing protection. As volume increases so does the chance of hearing loss. The effective non-lethal range of an AHD depends on the total acoustic output of the unit. Typically, this range is 50 metres (160 ft) or less.

In addition to its "voice" feature, which acts as a loudspeaker, the LRAD has an "alert" feature, which emits loud chirping or beeping sounds, which can be used at the top of the decibel range of the device. These sounds have been reported to cause pain and hearing damage. The use of the alert function for crowd control has been described as a "sound cannon" or sonic weapon, although this has been denied by the manufacturer.

The sound can be targeted within a narrow and specific range that does not impact those operating the device or standing next to it. Civil liberties organizations are concerned about its use by police forces, and its use has been contested in law courts in the United States. One concern is that police officers are not receiving enough training in its use. Due to potential risks and a lack of studies on the health impact of sonic weapons, the American Civil Liberties Union recommended in a fact sheet that their use in protests be suspended.

Law enforcement organizations and the manufacturer claim that LRAD systems are primarily designed for long-range communications; however, the device has an extremely high decibel capacity and has been controversially used as a less-lethal weapon for crowd control. Police usually use models that are not quite as powerful as the military-grade version; however, generating levels ranging from 137 dB to 154 dB, they are capable of causing pain, disorientation, nausea, migraines, and permanent hearing damage.

The New York City Police Department's LRAD use was to be challenged in US federal court in 2020. In the lawsuit, five protestors and photographers sued the city, alleging that they'd experienced migraines, sinus pain, dizziness, facial pressure and ear ringing after they were exposed to the LRAD's alert tone. The city settled the lawsuit in 2021, with an agreement that the police would be banned from using the alert feature and that rules would be created on how and when the police could use LRADs. The city also agreed to pay $98,000 in damages to the plaintiffs, as well as $650,000 in legal fees.

== Countermeasures ==
Because of their frequent use as crowd control during protests, as well as the risk of permanent hearing loss, there is growing public interest in methods to defend oneself against these devices. It has been reported that earplugs, earmuffs designed for noise reduction, as well as riot shields, paperboard, and poster board with the shiny side facing away from the user when held up in front of ones face can reduce the perceived effects of these devices. Noise-cancelling headphones and thick foam are reported to not provide meaningful protection.

== Deployments ==
=== Australia ===
By mid-2016, most Australian police forces had acquired LRADs (Queensland Police said that they had been using it since 2009), and concerns were raised about their use for crowd control. However, before 2020, there was no use of the LRAD in public situations; most usage had been by the various police forces for communications during natural disasters or for negotiations with hostage-takers in a siege, where it was too dangerous to approach a suspect. In June 2020, during the Black Lives Matter protests in New South Wales, NSW Police used LRADs for the purpose of crowd control for the first time, and it has been used at other anti-racism protests in Australia.

The device came to the attention of the wider public when it was used at the 2022 anti-vaccine mandate Canberra protests in "loud hailer" mode for voice messages to be announced to the protesters, and there was speculation among protesters regarding purported harms from its use. However, there was no evidence that it was used as a siren. In addition, some reports appeared to confuse the LRAD with other crowd control devices, such as the Active Denial System; one activist claimed that "supersonic weapons" had been used.

=== Czech Republic ===
On June 26, 2015, Czech Special Forces Police may have deployed an LRAD 500X during anti-immigration and anti-Islam protests in Brno, the second largest city in the Czech Republic.

Police in Prague used a vehicle-mounted LRAD on November 17, 2020, to repeatedly alert protesters on Wenceslas Square to follow COVID restrictions and wear masks. On that day, police supervised several rallies, meetings and demonstrations. Thousands of participants gathered at the largest protests in the Old Town Square. The police and a Prague City Hall representative used an LRAD to repeatedly call upon demonstrators to follow COVID public safety protocols and to comply with security measures.

During a November 25, 2021 march from the center of Prague to the local soccer stadium for a Europa Conference League match, Prague police and regional Czech law enforcement officers utilized vehicle mounted LRADs to broadcast frequent warnings against the use of pyrotechnics by the large crowds.

During the New Year’s Eve celebrations in downtown Prague from December 31, 2021, to January 1, 2022, police officers used a vehicle-mounted LRAD to issue more than 500 warnings to people not to set off fireworks.

A vehicle-mounted LRAD was deployed by police in Prague on March 11, 2023, to communicate to and warn away demonstrators from the National Museum.

=== France ===
On November 7, 2026, during the French student protests, sound cannons may have been used against protesters in Bordeaux according to multiple witnesses.

=== Greece ===
Hellenic Police acquired two LRAD systems to be used at the border of the European Union in the Evros region. These were tested after the March 2020 migrant crisis at the border, triggered by the Turkish government. They are to be used as a deterrent against illegal border entry, as a notification system, as well as to handle aggressive actions against the Hellenic Armed Forces. Commenting on reports of their use European Commission spokesperson Adalbert Jahnz stated that while member states get to decide on how they manage borders, “measures must be proportionate and respect fundamental rights, including asylum rights and the principle of non-refoulement". Since seeking consultation with the Greek government in 2021, no updates have been issued regarding their use.

=== Japan ===
Japan's Coast Guard used Long Range Acoustic Devices and other methods to expel a North Korean fishing flotilla from its waters in September 2017.

In February 2009, the Japanese whaling fleet operating in Antarctic waters near Australia installed LRADs on their vessels. The device was used against activists of the Sea Shepherd Conservation Society. The Japanese fleet later escalated the use of LRAD, deploying it against a Sea Shepherd helicopter carrying a camera crew. Sea Shepherd noted that they had an LRAD of their own, but as of early 2010, had not put it into use other than to play a recording of "Ride of the Valkyries" in the manner of attacking U.S. Army helicopters depicted in the 1979 film Apocalypse Now.

=== New Zealand ===
During the dispersion of New Zealand's parliament protest in March 2022, LRAD were used by New Zealand police against the protesters. A document released under the Official Information Act (OIA), revealed two long range acoustic devices (LRADs) were deployed at the Parliament protest on March 2.

=== Poland ===
LRAD was present, but not used because of current legal regulations during protests in Poland, including Million Marijuana March 2011 and Marsz Niepodległości (National Independence Day March) 2011 and 2012. Lacking a way to utilize the LRADs purchased to their full potential sparked an investigation suspecting corruption behind their acquisition. National Police Headquarters spokesman Mariusz Sokolowski defended the purchase of LRAD. He also stressed that the police decided to make this investment because, "We needed good sound reinforcement equipment. With numerous demonstrations and gatherings, police need a public address system that allows you to reach thousands of people."

Municipal police in Gdańsk, Poznań, Kołobrzeg and other cities in Poland used LRAD systems to deliver COVID-19 notifications.

=== Serbia ===
In December 2022 N1 reported that the Ministry of Internal Affairs acquired LRAD systems. The Ministry of Internal Affairs did not confirm or deny the report.

Opposition officials and Serbian rights groups stated that a military-grade sonic weapon was used during peaceful Serbian anti-corruption protests on March 15, 2025. Serbian police and the defense ministry denied that the weapon was used, as did president Aleksandar Vučić, who called it a "wicked lie" aimed at destroying Serbia.

=== Singapore ===
LRAD is used by the Singapore Changi Airport to disperse birds and wildlife from runways.

=== Spain ===
Local police in Leganés, Spain used a vehicle-mounted LRAD to deliver alerts and notifications to residents during the country-wide COVID-19 lockdown. According to Citizen Security, Communication and local government spokesman, Oscar Oliveira, "Because the acoustic device can be heard inside of houses, we can inform older residents with mobility issues that all municipal resources are available through the Citizen Attention Service by calling 010."

=== United Kingdom ===
It was confirmed by the Ministry of Defence on May 11, 2012, that an LRAD would be deployed in London during the 2012 Summer Olympic Games. It was spotted fixed to a landing craft on the River Thames.

=== United States ===
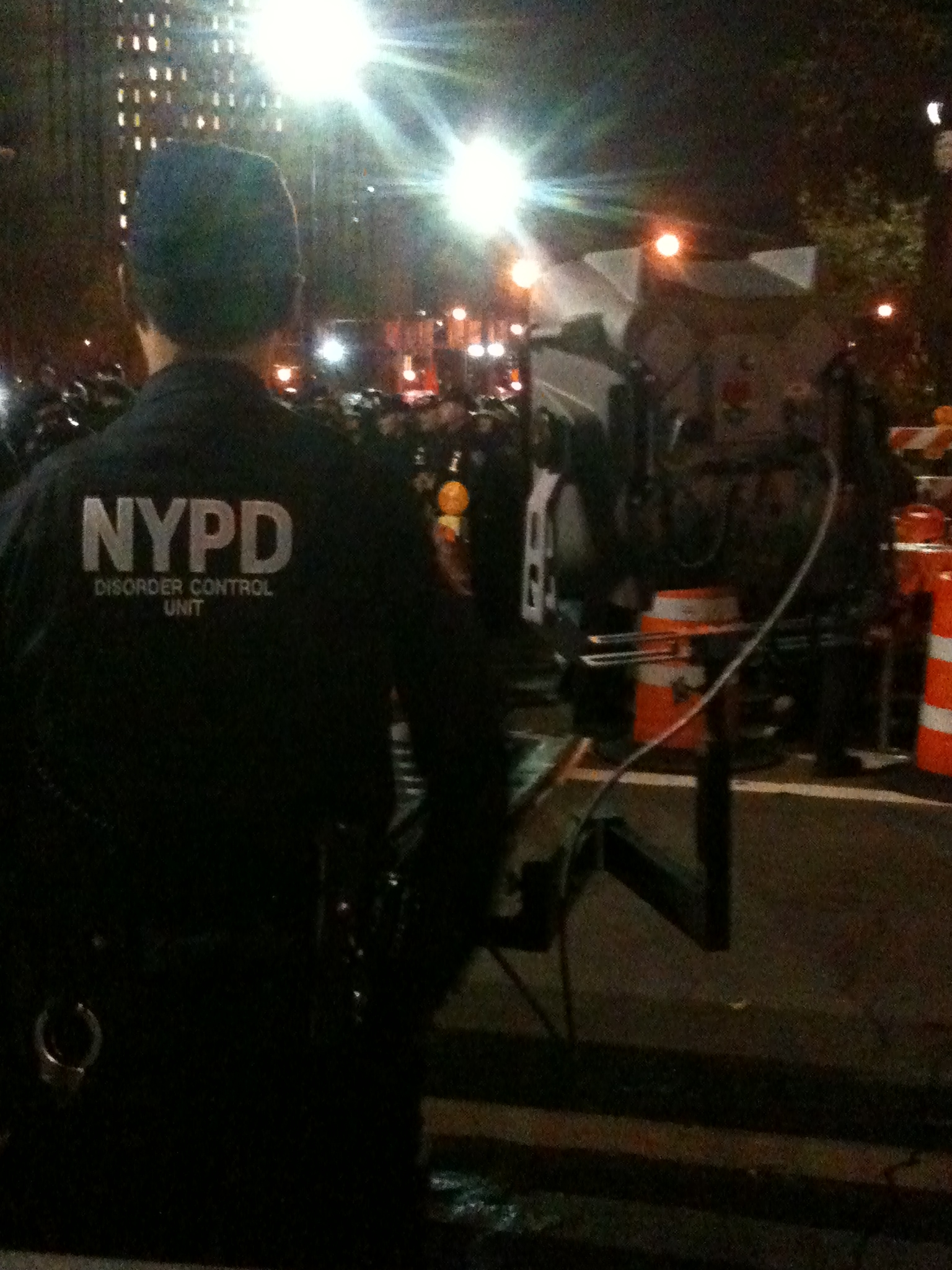
An NYPD officer stands ready with the LRAD 500X at an Occupy Wall Street protest on November 17, 2011, near the city hall.

An LRAD was present, but not used, during protests of the 2004 Republican National Convention in New York City. LRAD was present and used when the New York City Police department raided and destroyed the Occupy Wall Street encampment from Zuccotti Park to disrupt and disperse the crowd before arresting or ejecting them on the morning of 15 November 2011. On December 5, 2014, the NYPD utilized an LRAD, notifying approximately 100 protestors to disperse, during the protest of the police killing of Eric Garner in Midtown Manhattan. The NYPD used a Long Range Acoustic Device during the Baltimore solidarity rally in Union Square on April 29, 2015 following the killing of Freddie Gray in Baltimore. An NYPD pickup truck equipped with an LRAD parked near protesters and broadcast a looped warning message about staying off the streets and not blocking the sidewalks. Rochester NY police used verbal warnings and an LRAD to help disperse disorderly crowds during the August 2019 Puerto Rican Festival. Rochester, NY police used a Long Range Acoustic Device to make announcements to protesters that they were unlawfully in the roadway and obstructing traffic on September 12, 2020. The device was also used at the September 16, 2020 protest in front of Rochester city hall.

The Washington, D.C. Metropolitan Police Department used a LRAD at the January 21, 2017 Women's March. Protesters at the June 1, 2020 Washington, D.C. George Floyd protests said police gave little or no warning before employing aggressive tactics against them. A 2015 settlement requires federal police to give large crowds several loud dispersal orders before deploying chemical irritants and other dispersion tools. Using an LRAD to issue loud protest dispersal orders would have complied with the 2015 settlement requirement. In September 2020, it was revealed that federal officials had explored the use of the device and the Active Denial System ("heat ray") to disperse civilians protesting outside the White House in June of that year, but had been advised that the National Guard was not currently in possession of either device.

LRAD was reportedly used by the Oakland Police Department during the clearance of the Occupy Oakland encampment on the morning of 25 October 2011. Police in San Diego, California, used an LRAD on May 27, 2016, to order anti-Trump protesters to disperse. The Mendocino County (California) Board of Supervisors approved the purchase of a Long Range Acoustic Device for the Mendocino County Sheriff's Office on April 18, 2017. Sheriff Tom Allman said the device would aid in searches for missing persons, most often hunters and mushroom pickers, which cost the county tens of thousands of dollars. He said the LRAD might have made the intense 2011 manhunt for Aaron Bassler a little easier, and that it could be used to warn of a tsunami. MCSO found LRAD useful out of a low-flying plane, and it could help in a barricaded-person situation to communicate from the outside of the building.

The Greensboro, North Carolina Police Department (GPD) purchased an LRAD 300X and demonstrated it for reporters in November 2015. Jonathan Franks, a GPD captain, said that it could be used for alerts for everything from riots to missing children to weather disasters, and that it could save lives in some cases. The Charlotte-Mecklenburg, North Carolina Police Department Crisis Intervention Team and SWAT negotiators used a long-range acoustic device to talk a man down from an energized electrical tower.

The Phoenix, Arizona city council approved the purchase of two LRAD 500X systems in November 2018 "to give clear and concise messages to groups of people whenever we find it necessary". Police utilized a Long Range Acoustic device to declare an unlawful assembly in downtown Phoenix, Arizona, on May 28, 2020, during the George Floyd protests. Multiple announcements were made in English and Spanish.

The Salisbury, Maryland Police Department acquired an LRAD in October 2013 with proceeds from their speed cameras. On February 17, 2017, the Princess Anne Police Department deployed its LRAD system at the request of the Maryland State Police to disperse an unruly concert crowd on the campus of the University of Maryland Eastern Shore.

The Columbus, Ohio Police Department (CPD) demonstrated a Long Range Acoustic Device to the local media on November 21, 2016. CPD expects to use the device for crowd control, barricaded suspect operations, and to communicate to residents during emergencies and natural disasters. The Cuyahoga County Sheriff's Department purchased Long Range Acoustic Devices to improve the department's ability to issue dispersal orders clearly over long distances. The purchases resulted from the department's after-action report of the May 30, 2020 riot in downtown Cleveland, Ohio.

The Seattle Police Department in Washington purchased an LRAD in response to claims that it did not adequately communicate orders to demonstrators during the summer 2020 protests. SPD's use of its LRAD was alleged to have caused ear damage to a peaceful demonstrator, although an internal SPD review deemed the allegations to be unsustained. After receiving feedback from protesters who said commands from on-scene officers were not clear or loud enough, the Seattle, Washington mayor's office recommended purchasing an LRAD.

LRADs were used by the Pittsburgh PD in Pennsylvania during protests at the G20 Summit in September 2009. This was the first time the LRAD was used during a protest in the U.S.

LRAD was deployed during a march against NATO's actions and policies in Chicago, Illinois on May 20, 2012, at Michigan Ave. & Cermak.

St. Louis County police used LRAD during protests surrounding the police shooting of Michael Brown in Ferguson, Missouri.

Myrtle Beach, South Carolina police obtained two LRAD systems through a federal grant in March 2015. Myrtle Beach police captain Marty Brown told the Myrtle Beach city council that "his department is getting the LRADs to enhance their communication capabilities be it with large crowds or for emergency announcements such as evacuation orders."

The New Jersey State Police used an armored-vehicle-mounted LRAD to communicate with crowds denied entry to a June 7, 2015 concert after they began throwing bottles and tried to rush the gates outside MetLife Stadium.

Police from several agencies, including North Dakota state troopers, the National Guard, and other law enforcement agencies from surrounding counties and states deployed two LRADs to clear a protest camp and blockades along Highway 1806. "Long Range Acoustic Devices, which emit an ear-splitting whine, were used intermittently throughout the day" one reporter wrote. An LRAD was present again on November 20, 2016, at the bridge just north of the protesters camp on highway 1806.

During the same period, the LRAD was used at a protest in front of the Arkansas State Capitol.

The Portland Police Bureau in Oregon used a vehicle-mounted LRAD during the protests there following the murder of George Floyd on June 4, 2020, and on other occasions during the protests.

A BearCat-mounted LRAD was used to emit voice messages and high-pitched sirens in Kenosha, Wisconsin on August 24, 2020, in front of the Kenosha County Courthouse to disperse crowds assembled in Civic Center Park as part of the Jacob Blake protests.

On March 6, 2021, the Boulder Police Department used a toned warble noise from an LRAD in an effort to disperse a crowd of up to 800 students from the University of Colorado Boulder. The University Hill Incident occurred when code enforcement and members of Boulder Police's Neighborhood Impact Team were unable to disperse partygoers who were congregating against Boulder's public health order. LRAD was used after students and other partygoers began throwing rocks at SWAT vehicles and officers.

On April 12, 2021, the Brooklyn Center, Minnesota Police Department deployed a vehicle mounted LRAD outside of its headquarters to announce curfew violations and dispersal orders to a large crowd protesting the death of Daunte Wright.

On July 3, 2021, Massachusetts State Police utilized an LRAD to secure a group of 11 suspects involved in the Sovereign Citizen movement. The group identified themselves as part of the "Rise of the Moors" movement, or "Moorish Americans". The self styled militia group was traveling between Rhode Island and Maine when an MSP trooper came across their convoy refueling. The group had multiple firearms in their possession, and admitted to not having proper carrying requirements. Several fled into the surrounding forest, at which point the LRAD was deployed. The group was taken into custody without further incident.

The Oklahoma County, Oklahoma Sheriff's Office Tactical Team used a vehicle-mounted LRAD on November 22, 2021, to serve a search warrant on a residence suspected of being used for drug trafficking.

On January 26th, 2026, a live YouTube stream by IRT Media captured law enforcement's deployment of a directional LRAD against Minneapolis demonstrators protesting United States federal immigration enforcement operations, following the killings of Alex Pretti and Renée Good by federal agents. The LRAD's activation was preceded with the phrase, "This is a test of the Long-Range Acoustic Device, LRAD: one, two, three".

== Mass notification ==
=== Australia ===
Genasys has supplied its NEWS mass notification service in Australia since 2013, when it partnered with Nokia to deliver emergency notifications via SMS, following the disastrous consequences of the Black Saturday bushfires in 2009.

=== Germany ===
In the first half of 2020, Bad Homburg's fire brigade and city police used an LRAD 100X system more than 60 times to deliver COVID-19 information.

=== United States ===
Menlo Park and Atherton, California police and fire officials attended a 'sound off' between a siren installation and an LRAD 360XT mobile voice mass notification system in April 2018. "The side by side test was very helpful and everyone agreed that the LRAD system completely outperformed the older siren system," said Fire District Emergency Manager Ryan Zollicoffer. "Not only because of the voice capability, but the modular-mobility benefit is something that appeals to first responders because it can be used for a variety of public safety purposes and better moved around if that's needed or desired."

The Menlo Park Fire District demonstrated its Long Range Acoustic Device (LRAD) community notification system on April 18, 2019. The fire district also showed how the ShakeAlert system could eventually be tied together with its LRAD to provide area wide audible alerts for earthquake, flood, fire and other emergencies. "ShakeAlert will notify and protect our Station firefighters, but we also believe coupled with the LRAD public address system, it can help to bridge the 'notification gap' as another important public safety tool and option for community early warning messaging for earthquakes as well as for fire and flooding information and evacuation signaling," said Fire Chief Harold Schapelhouman.

The City of Laguna Beach, California, installed LRAD speaker sirens in 2018. The systems alert the downtown and Main Beach areas during an emergency where the public needs to take immediate action.

In June 2019, Mill Valley, California, became the first city in the Bay Area to replace its sirens with LRAD community notification systems. The combined siren loudspeakers receive emergency messages via satellite and have backup batteries if the power fails.

The Mill Valley Fire Department began testing its city's new LRAD installations on June 27, 2019. LRAD systems project both siren and voice recordings to alert and inform community members during large-scale disasters. The Long Range Acoustic Devices replaced siren-only systems in five Mill Valley, California locations. "We believe that the purchase and installation of LRAD goes a long way to improve the resiliency and redundancy of our communication systems," Mill Valley Fire Chief Tom Welch said. "LRAD systems are highly effective in communicating warnings, instructions, and notifications throughout incident sites and over vast areas during life-threatening events."

The City of Newport Beach plans to spend $200,000 to replace three rusty tsunami warning sirens on the Balboa Peninsula with LRAD siren/public address systems. The LRAD systems are expected to be installed by the end of 2019.

In October 2020, Laguna Beach, California, tested its expanded outdoor warning system of 13 Long Range Acoustic Devices mounted on buildings throughout the city. The solar-powered devices broadcast recorded evacuation messages in case cell service is disabled during a disaster.

Seven new LRAD emergency siren systems are scheduled for installation in southern Marin County in 2022.

The Berkeley, California city council approved the installation of a Genasys outdoor warning system to alert residents of fires, earthquakes, tsunamis and other disasters. The system is capable of running on solar-powered battery backup and being controlled remotely via satellite.

Public safety officials in Berkeley, California unveiled the city's new Genasys emergency warning network during the September 17, 2023 Fire Ready Fest. Ten systems that broadcast both sirens and voice messages have been installed on buildings throughout Berkeley to provide another layer of reaching residents and visitors in the event of serious emergencies. Five more systems are projected to be installed by early 2024.

== High seas anti-piracy ==
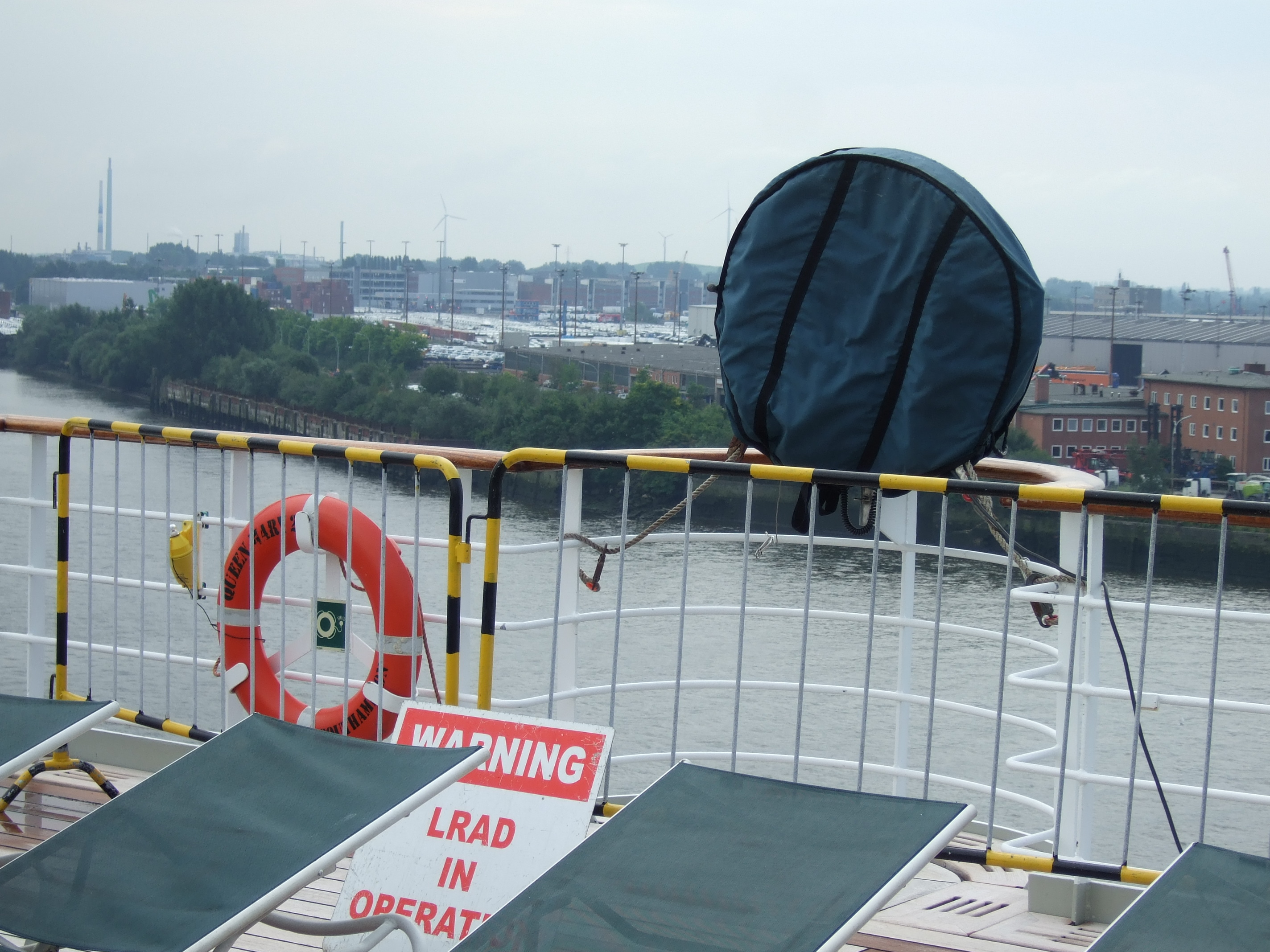
LRAD on RMS Queen Mary 2

On November 5, 2005, the luxury cruise ship Seabourn Spirit employed an LRAD to repel pirates who attacked the vessel with rocket-propelled grenades about 115 kilometres (71 mi) off the coast of Somalia. The effectiveness of this device during the attack is not completely clear, but the pirates did not succeed in boarding the vessel and eventually fled.

The Liberian-flagged vessel MV Biscaglia was attacked on November 28, 2008. The security detachment aboard Biscaglia was reported to have used an LRAD in an effort to repel attackers armed with assault rifles and rocket-propelled grenades. Following a one-sided shootout, the ship was seized and the unarmed security contractors abandoned ship leaving the ship and crew to the pirates. The incident caused the usefulness of LRADs to be called into question by Lloyd's List. The security detachment's reported use of LRAD is not completely clear as The Wall Street Journal makes no mention of LRAD being used during the incident.

In January 2011, the Spirit of Adventure, a cruise ship sailing through the Indian Ocean, deployed an LRAD system as part of its defensive measures when being pursued by pirates.

S/Y Hideaway used an LRAD in 2016 to deter suspected pirates in the Gulf of Aden.

== Major users ==
- Algeria: Used for the first time in April 2019 during the pacific walk against Bouteflika on the Algerian population
- Australia: Victoria Police, the Western Australian Police, the South Australia Police, the Queensland Police Service and the Australian Federal Police have confirmed they have purchased the devices.
- Azerbaijan: Azerbaijan police
- Brazil
- Canada: Multiple police departments
- China: China Coast Guard
- Czech Republic: Used first time on March 18, 2017, by the Police of the Czech Republic
- Georgia
- Greece
- Honduras
- Hong Kong: Police Tactical Unit and Police Negotiation Cadre (PNC) of the Hong Kong Police Force
- India: Delhi Police
- Israel: Ministry of Defense, Israel Police
- Japan
- New Zealand: New Zealand Police
- Norway: Norwegian Navy onboard Fridtjof Nansen-class frigates
- Philippines: Philippine National Police, Philippine Coast Guard
- Poland: Polish Police (acquired, but legal reasons were preventing its usage)
- Romania: Used first time on June 7, 2015, by Jandarmeria Română
- Singapore: Used by the Singapore Armed Forces
- South Africa: South African Police Service, South African Navy
- Spain: Reported use by Catalan Police
- Sweden: Swedish Navy
- Thailand
- Turkey: Used by the Turkish Naval Forces
- United Kingdom: Ministry of Defence
- United States: Multiple police departments and federal agencies, US Navy, US Coast Guard and US Army
- Vietnam: Being used on-board DN-2000-class ships of the Vietnam Coast Guard's fleet.

== See also ==
- Acoustics
- Megaphone
- Sonic weapon
- Electronic harassment – Delusion regarding mind manipulation by electronic means
