= Radiation burn =

Damage to skin or biological tissue from radiation exposure

- Other names: Radiodermatitis
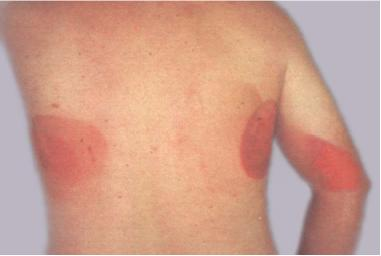
- Ionizing radiation burn: large red patches of skin on the back and arm from multiple prolonged fluoroscopy procedures
- Specialty: Dermatology

A radiation burn is a damage to the skin or other biological tissue and organs as an effect of radiation. The radiation types of greatest concern are thermal radiation, radio frequency energy, ultraviolet light and ionizing radiation.

The most common type of radiation burn is a sunburn caused by UV radiation. High exposure to X-rays during diagnostic medical imaging or radiotherapy can also result in radiation burns. As the ionizing radiation interacts with cells within the body—damaging them—the body responds to this damage, typically resulting in erythema—that is, redness around the damaged area. Radiation burns are often discussed in the same context as radiation-induced cancer due to the ability of ionizing radiation to interact with and damage DNA, occasionally inducing a cell to become cancerous. Cavity magnetrons can be improperly used to create surface and internal burning. Depending on the photon energy, gamma radiation can cause deep gamma burns, with ^{60}Co internal burns common. Beta burns tend to be shallow as beta particles are not able to penetrate deeply into a body; these burns can be similar to sunburn. Alpha particles can cause internal alpha burns if inhaled, with external damage (if any) being limited to minor erythema.

Radiation burns can also occur with high power radio transmitters at any frequency where the body absorbs radio frequency energy and converts it to heat. The U.S. Federal Communications Commission (FCC) considers 50 watts to be the lowest power above which radio stations must evaluate emission safety. Frequencies considered especially dangerous occur where the human body can become resonant, at 35 MHz, 70 MHz, 80-100 MHz, 400 MHz, and 1 GHz. Exposure to microwaves of too high intensity can cause microwave burns.

== Types ==
Radiation dermatitis (also known as radiodermatitis) is a skin disease associated with prolonged exposure to ionizing radiation. Radiation dermatitis occurs to some degree in most patients receiving radiation therapy, with or without chemotherapy.

There are three specific types of radiodermatitis: acute radiodermatitis, chronic radiodermatitis, and eosinophilic, polymorphic, and pruritic eruption associated with radiotherapy. Radiation therapy can also cause radiation cancer.

With interventional fluoroscopy, because of the high skin doses that can be generated in the course of the intervention, some procedures have resulted in early (less than two months after exposure) and/or late (two months or more after exposure) skin reactions, including necrosis in some cases.

Radiation dermatitis, in the form of intense erythema and vesiculation of the skin, may be observed in radiation ports.

As many as 95% of patients treated with radiation therapy for cancer will experience a skin reaction. Some reactions are immediate, while others may be later (e.g., months after treatment).

=== Acute ===
Acute radiodermatitis occurs when an "erythema dose" of ionizing radiation is given to the skin, after which visible erythema appears up to 24 hours after. Radiation dermatitis generally manifests within a few weeks after the start of radiotherapy. Acute radiodermatitis, while presenting as red patches, may sometimes also present with desquamation or blistering. Erythema may occur at a dose of 2 Gy radiation or greater.

=== Chronic ===
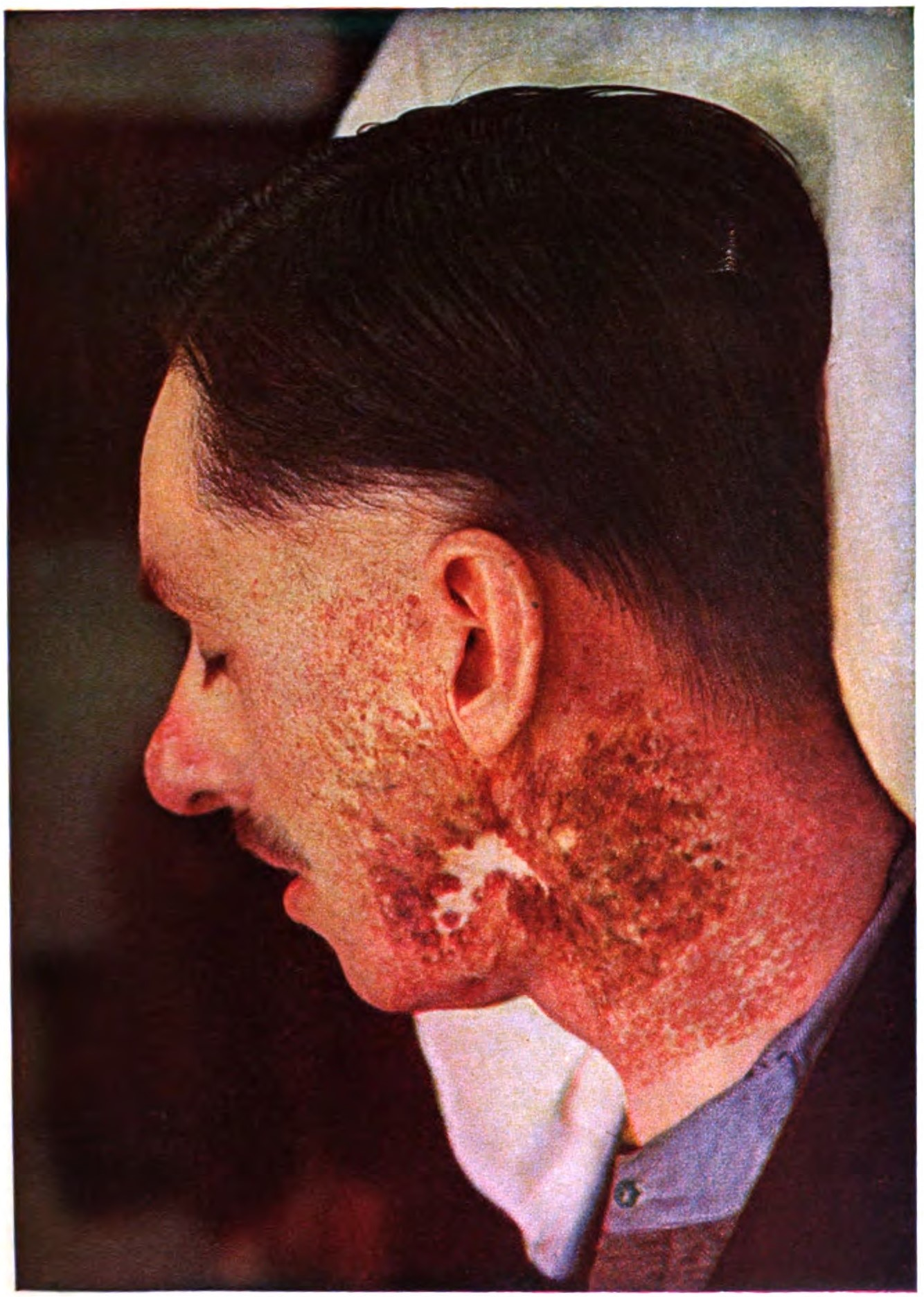
Chronic radiodermatitis on the neck and jaw from X-ray exposure

Chronic radiodermatitis occurs with chronic exposure to "sub-erythema" doses of ionizing radiation over a prolonged period, producing varying degrees of damage to the skin and its underlying parts after a variable latent period of several months to several decades. In the past this type of radiation reaction occurred most frequently in radiologists and radiographers who were constantly exposed to ionizing radiation, especially before the use of X-ray filters. Chronic radiodermatitis, squamous and basal cell carcinomas may develop months to years after radiation exposure. Chronic radiodermatitis presents as atrophic indurated plaques, often whitish or yellowish, with telangiectasia, sometimes with hyperkeratosis.

=== Other ===
Eosinophilic, polymorphic, and pruritic eruption associated with radiotherapy is a skin condition that occurs most often in women receiving cobalt radiotherapy for internal cancer.

Radiation-induced erythema multiforme may occur when phenytoin is given prophylactically to neurosurgical patients who are receiving whole-brain therapy and systemic steroids.

=== Delayed effects ===
Radiation acne is a cutaneous condition characterized by comedo-like papules occurring at sites of previous exposure to therapeutic ionizing radiation, skin lesions that begin to appear as the acute phase of radiation dermatitis begins to resolve.

Radiation recall reactions occur months to years after radiation treatment, a reaction that follows recent administration of a chemotherapeutic agent and occurs with the prior radiation port, characterized by features of radiation dermatitis. Restated, radiation recall dermatitis is an inflammatory skin reaction that occurs in a previously irradiated body part following drug administration. There does not appear to be a minimum dose, nor an established radiotherapy dose relationship.

== Alpha burns ==
Alpha burns are caused by alpha particles, which can cause extensive tissue damage if emitted within the body by inhaled or ingested sources. Due to the keratin in the epidermal layer of the skin, external alpha burns are limited to only mild reddening of the outermost layer of skin.

== Beta burns ==
Beta burns—caused by beta particles—are shallow surface burns, usually of skin and less often of lungs or gastrointestinal tract, caused by beta particles, typically from hot particles or dissolved radionuclides that came to direct contact with or close proximity to the body. They can appear similar to sunburn. Unlike gamma rays, beta emissions are stopped much more effectively by materials and therefore deposit all their energy in only a shallow layer of tissue, causing more intense but more localized damage. On cellular level, the changes in skin are similar to radiodermatitis.

The dose is influenced by relatively low penetration of beta emissions through materials. The cornified keratine layer of epidermis has enough stopping power to absorb beta radiation with energies lower than 70 keV. Further protection is provided by clothing, especially shoes. The dose is further reduced by limited retention of radioactive particles on skin; a 1 millimeter particle is typically released in 2 hours, while a 50 micrometer particle usually does not adhere for more than 7 hours. Beta emissions are also severely attenuated by air; their range generally does not exceed 6 feet (1.8 m) and intensity rapidly diminishes with distance.

The eye lens seems to be the most sensitive organ to beta radiation, even in doses far below maximum permissible dose. Safety goggles are recommended to attenuate strong beta.

Careful washing of exposed body surface, removing the radioactive particles, may provide significant dose reduction. Exchanging or at least brushing off clothes also provides a degree of protection.

If the exposure to beta radiation is intense, the beta burns may first manifest in 24–48 hours by itching and/or burning sensation that last for one or two days, sometimes accompanied by hyperaemia. After 1–3 weeks burn symptoms appear; erythema, increased skin pigmentation (dark colored patches and raised areas), followed by epilation and skin lesions. Erythema occurs after 5–15 Gy, dry desquamation after 17 Gy, and bullous epidermitis after 72 Gy. Chronic radiation keratosis may develop after higher doses. Primary erythema lasting more than 72 hours is an indication of injury severe enough to cause chronic radiation dermatitis. Edema of dermal papillae, if present within 48 hours since the exposition, is followed by transepidermal necrosis. After higher doses, the malpighian layer cells die within 24 hours; lower doses may take 10–14 days to show dead cells. Inhalation of beta radioactive isotopes may cause beta burns of lungs and nasopharyngeal region, ingestion may lead to burns of gastrointestinal tract; the latter being a risk especially for grazing animals.

- In first degree beta burns the damage is largely limited to epidermis. Dry or wet desquamation occurs; dry scabs are formed, then heal rapidly, leaving a depigmented area surrounded with irregular area of increased pigmentation. The skin pigmentation returns to normal within several weeks.
- Second degree beta burns lead to formation of blisters.
- Third and fourth degree beta burns result in deeper, wet ulcerated lesions, which heal with routine medical care after covering themselves with dry scab. In case of heavy tissue damage, ulcerated necrotic dermatitis may occur. Pigmentation may return to normal within several months after wound healing.

Lost hair begins regrowing in nine weeks and is completely restored in about half a year.

The acute dose-dependent effects of beta radiation on skin are as follows:

0–6 Gy	no acute effect
6–20 Gy	moderate early erythema
20–40 Gy	early erythema in 24 hours, skin breakdown in 2 weeks
40–100 Gy	severe erythema in less than 24 hours
100–150 Gy	severe erythema in less than 4 hours, skin breakdown in 1–2 weeks
150–1000 Gy	blistering immediate or up to 1 day

According to other source:

2–6 Gy	transient erythema 2–24 h
3–5 Gy	dry desquamation in 3–6 weeks
3–4 Gy	temporary epilation in 3 weeks
10–15 Gy	erythema 18–20 days
15–20 Gy	moist desquamation
25 Gy	ulceration with slow healing
30–50 Gy	blistering, necrosis in 3 weeks
100 Gy	blistering, necrosis in 1–3 weeks

As shown, the dose thresholds for symptoms vary by source and even individually. In practice, determining the exact dose tends to be difficult.

Similar effects apply to animals, with fur acting as additional factor for both increased particle retention and partial skin shielding. Unshorn thickly wooled sheep are well protected; while the epilation threshold for sheared sheep is between 23 and 47 Gy (2500–5000 rep) and the threshold for normally wooled face is 47–93 Gy (5000–10000 rep), for thickly wooled (33 mm hair length) sheep it is 93–140 Gy (10000–15000 rep). To produce skin lesions comparable with contagious pustular dermatitis, the estimated dose is between 465 and 1395 Gy.

=== Energy vs penetration depth ===
Medium-lived fission products
Nuclide	t_{1/2}	Yield	Q (Note: Decay energy is split among β, neutrino, and γ if any.)	βγ
	(a)	(%) (Note: Per 65 thermal neutron fissions of ^{235}U and 35 of ^{239}Pu.)	(keV)	
^{155}Eu	4.74	0.0803 (Note: Neutron poison; in thermal reactors, most is destroyed by further neutron capture.)	252	βγ
^{85}Kr	10.73	0.2180 (Note: Less than 1/4 of mass-85 fission products as most bypass ground state: ^{85}Br → ^{85m}Kr → ^{85}Rb.)	687	βγ
^{113m}Cd	13.9	0.0008	316	β
^{90}Sr	28.91	4.505	2826 (Note: Has decay energy 546 keV; its decay product ^{90}Y has decay energy 2.28 MeV with weak gamma branching.)	β
^{137}Cs	30.04	6.337	1176	βγ
^{121m}Sn	43.9	0.00005	390	βγ
^{151}Sm	94.6	0.5314	77	β

The effects depend on both the intensity and the energy of the radiation. Low-energy beta (sulfur-35, 170 keV) produces shallow ulcers with little damage to dermis, while cobalt-60 (310 keV), caesium-137 (550 keV), phosphorus-32 (1.71 MeV), strontium-90 (650 keV) and its daughter product yttrium-90 (2.3 MeV) damage deeper levels of the dermis and can result in chronic radiation dermatitis. Very high energies from electron beams from particle accelerators, reaching tens of megaelectronvolts, can be deeply penetrating. Conversely, megavolt-scale beams can deposit their energy deeper with less damage to the dermis; modern radiotherapy electron beam accelerators take advantage of this. At yet higher energies, above 16 MeV, the effect does not show significantly anymore, limiting the usefulness of higher energies for radiotherapy. As a convention, surface is defined as the topmost 0.5 mm of skin. High-energy beta emissions should be shielded with plastic instead of lead, as high-Z elements generate deeply penetrating gamma bremsstrahlung.

The electron energies from beta decay are not discrete but form a continuous spectrum with a cutoff at maximum energy. The rest of the energy of each decay is carried off by an antineutrino which does not significantly interact and therefore does not contribute to the dose. Most energies of beta emissions are at about a third of the maximum energy. Beta emissions have much lower energies than what is achievable from particle accelerators, no more than few megaelectronvolts.

The energy-depth-dose profile is a curve starting with a surface dose, ascending to the maximum dose in a certain depth d_{m} (usually normalized as 100% dose), then descends slowly through depths of 90% dose (d_{90}) and 80% dose (d_{80}), then falls off linearly and relatively sharply though depth of 50% dose (d_{50}). The extrapolation of this linear part of the curve to zero defines the maximum electron range, R_{p}. In practice, there is a long tail of weaker but deep dose, called "bremsstrahlung tail", attributable to bremsstrahlung. The penetration depth depends also on beam shape, narrower beam tend to have less penetration. In water, broad electron beams, as is the case in homogeneous surface contamination of skin, have d_{80} about E/3 cm and R_{p} about E/2 cm, where E is the beta particle energy in MeV.

The penetration depth of lower-energy beta in water (and soft tissues) is about 2 mm/MeV. For a 2.3 MeV beta the maximum depth in water is 11 mm, for 1.1 MeV it is 4.6 mm. The depth where maximum of the energy is deposited is significantly lower.

The energy and penetration depth of several isotopes is as follows:

Isotope	Half-life	Specific activity (TBq/g)	Avg. (keV)	Max. (keV)	In air (mm)	In tissue (mm)	Comments
Tritium	12.3 years	357	5.7	18.6	6	0.006	no beta passes the dead layer of skin; however, tritium and its compounds may diffuse through skin
Carbon-14	5730 years	0.165	49	156	240	0.28	about 1% of beta passes through the dead layer of skin
Sulfur-35	87.44 days	1580	48.8	167.47	260	0.32	
Phosphorus-33	25.3 days	5780	76.4	248.5	500	0.6	
Phosphorus-32	14.29 days	10600	695	1710	6100	7.6	risk of Bremsstrahlung if improperly shielded

For a wide beam, the depth-energy relation for dose ranges is as follows, for energies in megaelectronvolts and depths in millimeters. The dependence of surface dose and penetration depth on beam energy is clearly visible.

MeV	Surface dose %	Max. depth	90%	80%	50%	10%	R_{p}
5	74%	9	12	14	17	22	23
7	76%	16	20	22	27	33	34
10	82%	24	31	34	39	48	49
13	88%	32	40	43	51	61	64
16	93%	34	51	56	65	80	80
19	94%	26–36	59	67	78	95	95
22	96%	26–36	65	76	93	113	114
25	96%	26–36	65	80	101	124	124

== Causes ==
Radiation burns are caused by exposure to high levels of radiation. Levels high enough to cause burn are generally lethal if received as a whole-body dose, whereas they may be treatable if received as a shallow or local dose.

=== Medical imaging ===
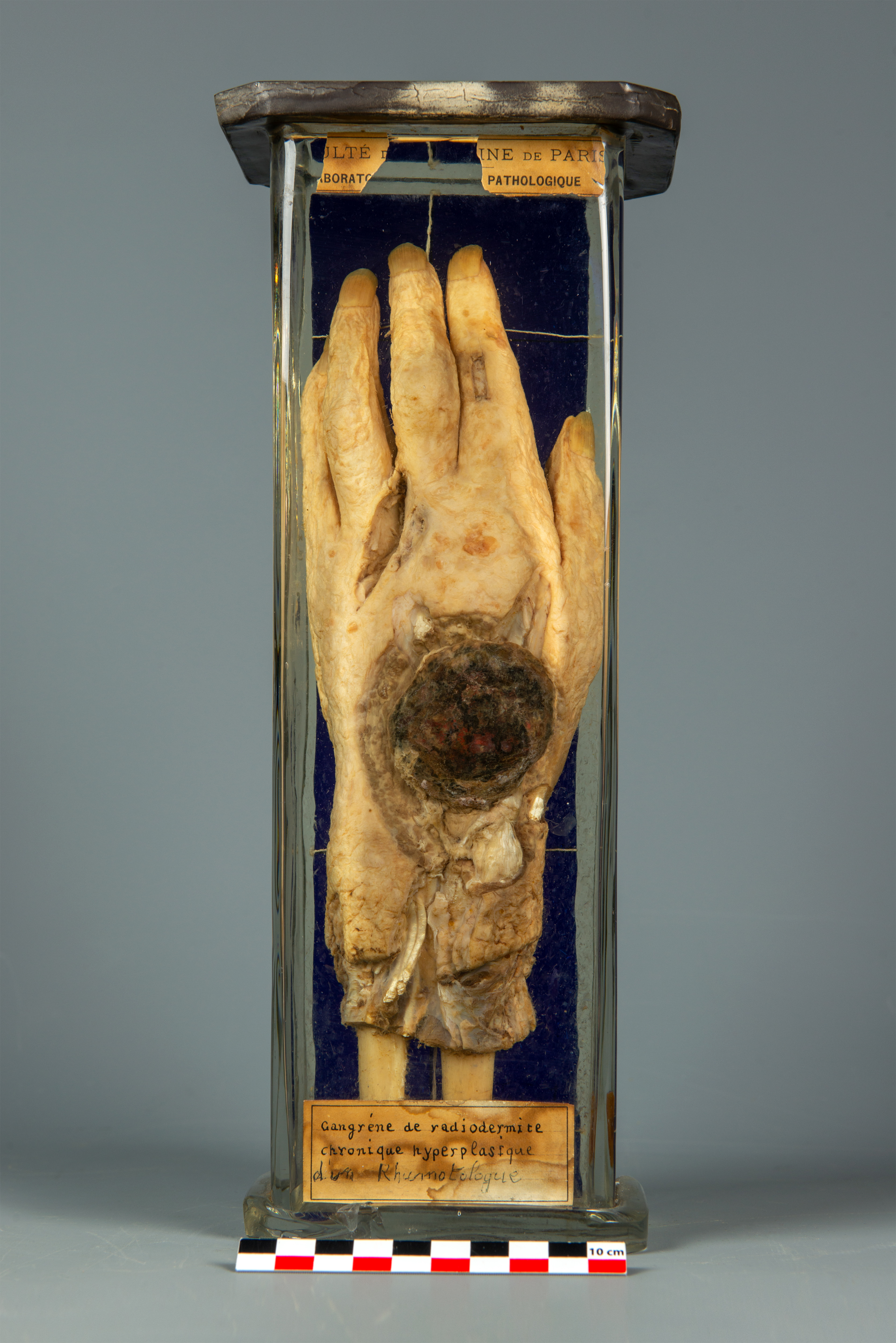
Left hand affected by radiation burns (Sorbonne University)

Fluoroscopy may cause burns if performed repeatedly or for too long.

Similarly, X-ray computed tomography and traditional projectional radiography have the potential to cause radiation burns if the exposure factors and exposure time are not appropriately controlled by the operator.

A study of radiation-induced skin injuries has been performed by the Food and Drug Administration (FDA) based on results from 1994, followed by an advisory to minimize further fluoroscopy-induced injuries. The problem of radiation injuries due to fluoroscopy has been further investigated in review articles in 2000, 2001, 2009 and 2010.

=== Radioactive fallout ===
Beta burns are frequently the result of exposure to radioactive fallout after nuclear explosions or nuclear accidents. Shortly after the explosion, the fission products have very high beta activity, with about two beta emissions per each gamma photon.

After the Trinity test, the fallout caused localized burns on the backs of cattle in the area downwind. The fallout had the appearance of small flaky dust particles. The cattle showed temporary burns, bleeding, and loss of hair. Dogs were also affected; in addition to localized burns on their backs, they also had burned paws, likely from the particles lodged between their toes as hoofed animals did not show problems with feet. About 350–600 cattle were affected by superficial burns and localized temporary loss of dorsal hair; the army later bought 75 most affected cows as the discolored regrown hair lowered their market value. The cows were shipped to Los Alamos and Oak Ridge, where they were observed. They healed, now sporting large patches of white fur; some looked as if they had been scalded.

The fallout produced by the Castle Bravo test was unexpectedly strong. A white snow-like dust, nicknamed by the scientists "Bikini snow" and consisting of contaminated crushed calcined coral, fell for about 12 hours upon the Rongelap Atoll, depositing a layer of up to 2 cm. Residents developed beta burns, mostly on the backs of their necks and on their feet, and were resettled after three days. After 24–48 hours their skin was itching and burning; in a day or two the sensations subsided, to be followed after 2–3 weeks by epilation and ulcers. Darker-colored patches and raised areas appeared on their skin, blistering was uncommon. Ulcers formed dry scabs and healed. Deeper lesions, painful, weeping and ulcerated, formed on more contaminated residents; the majority healed with simple treatment. In general, the beta burns healed with some cutaneous scarring and depigmentation. Individuals who bathed and washed the fallout particles from their skin did not develop skin lesions. The fishing ship Daigo Fukuryu Maru was affected by the fallout as well; the crew suffered skin doses between 1.7 and 6.0 Gy, with beta burns manifesting as severe skin lesions, erythema, erosions, sometimes necrosis, and skin atrophy. Twenty-three U.S. radar servicemen of the 28-member weather station on Rongerik were affected, experiencing discrete 1–4 mm skin lesions which healed quickly, and ridging of fingernails several months later. Sixteen crew members of the aircraft carrier USS Bairoko received beta burns, and there was an increased cancer rate.

During the Zebra test of the Operation Sandstone in 1948, three men had beta burns on their hands when removing sample collection filters from drones flying through the mushroom cloud; their estimated skin surface dose was 28 to 149 Gy, and their disfigured hands required skin grafts. A fourth man showed weaker burns after the earlier Yoke test.

The Upshot–Knothole Harry test at the Frenchman Flat site released a large amount of fallout. A significant number of sheep died after grazing on contaminated areas. The AEC however had a policy to compensate farmers only for animals showing external beta burns, so many claims were denied. Other tests on the Nevada Test Site also caused fallout and corresponding beta burns to sheep, horses and cattle. During the Operation Upshot–Knothole, sheep as far as 50 miles (80 km) from the test site developed beta burns to their backs and nostrils.

During underground nuclear testing in Nevada, several workers developed burns and skin ulcers, in part attributed to exposure to tritium.

=== Nuclear accidents ===
Beta burns were a serious medical issue for some victims of the Chernobyl disaster; from 115 patients treated in Moscow, 30% had burns covering 10–50% of body surface, 11% were affected on 50–100% of skin; the massive exposure was often caused by clothes drenched with radioactive water. Some firefighters developed beta burns of lungs and nasopharyngeal region after inhalation of massive amounts of radioactive smoke. Out of 28 deaths, 16 had skin injuries listed among the causes. The beta activity was extremely high, with beta/gamma ratio reaching 10–30 and beta energy high enough to damage basal layer of the skin, resulting in large area portals for infections, exacerbated by damage to bone marrow and weakened immune system. Some patients received skin dose of 400–500 Gy. The infections caused more than half of the acute deaths. Several died of fourth degree beta burns between 9–28 days after dose of 6–16 Gy. Seven died after dose of 4–6 Gy and third degree beta burns in 4–6 weeks. One died later from second degree beta burns and dose 1-4 Gy. The survivors have atrophied skin which is spider veined and with underlying fibrosis.

The burns may manifest at different times at different body areas. The Chernobyl liquidators' burns first appeared on wrists, face, neck and feet, followed by chest and back, then by knees, hips and buttocks.

Industrial radiography sources are a common source of beta burns in workers.

Radiation therapy sources can cause beta burns during exposure of the patients. The sources can be also lost and mishandled, as in the Goiânia accident, during which several people had external beta burns and more serious gamma burns, and several died. Numerous accidents also occur during radiotherapy due to equipment failures, operator errors, or wrong dosage.

Electron beam sources and particle accelerators can be also sources of beta burns. The burns may be fairly deep and require skin grafts, tissue resection or even amputation of fingers or limbs.

== Treatment ==
Radiation burns should be covered by a clean, dry dressing as soon as possible to prevent infection. Wet dressings are not recommended. The presence of combined injury (exposure to radiation plus trauma or radiation burn) increases the likelihood of generalized sepsis. This requires administration of systemic antimicrobial therapy.

== See also ==
- Effective radiated power
- Radiation poisoning
- Radiation protection
- Therac-25
