= LED incapacitator =

Weapon designed like a flashlight

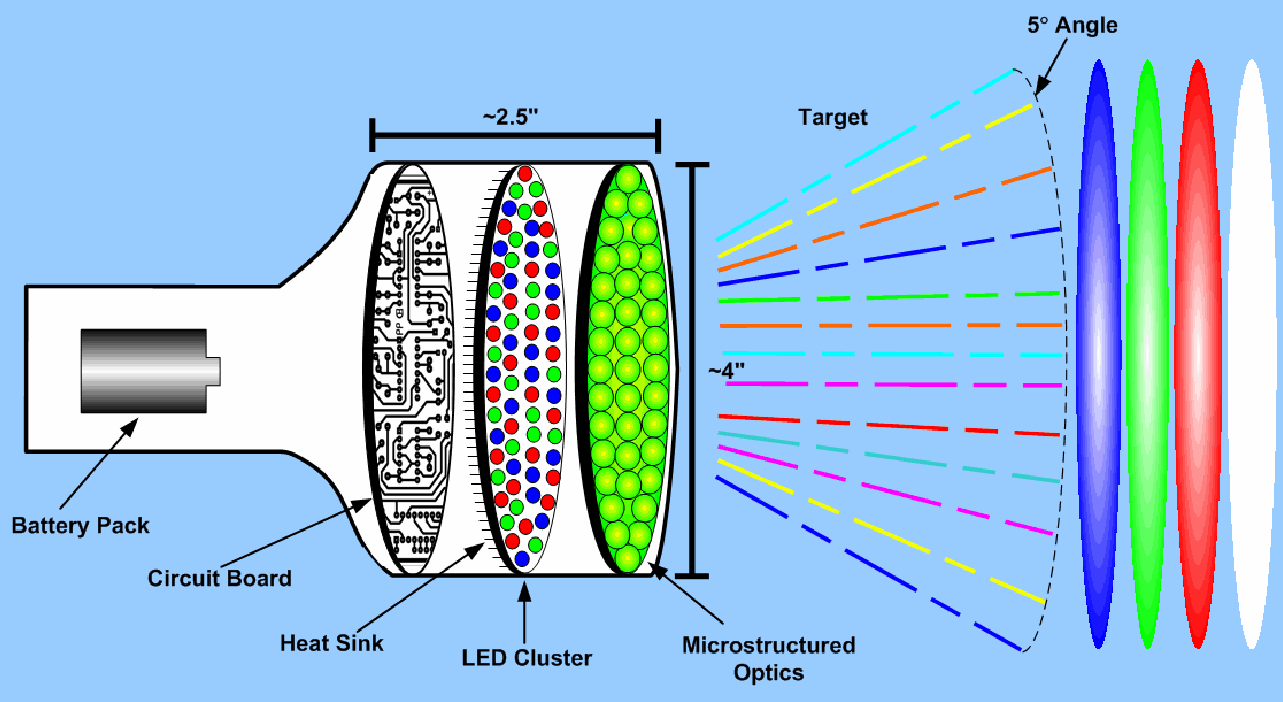
Cross-sectional diagram of the "Incapacitator", from a DHS newsletter

A light emitting diode (LED) incapacitator is a weapon designed like a flashlight. It emits an extremely bright, rapid, and well-focused series of "differently-colored random pulses". Before human eyes can focus in on one frequency, another frequency comes on, causing intracranial pressure, which results in headache, nausea, vomiting, disorientation, irritability, and visual impairment to the target.

The non-lethal weapon is intended as a means of protection by law enforcement officials such as police and border patrols. The light emitted is capable of rendering opponents temporarily blind so that they can be subdued more easily.

== Description ==
According to the United States Department of Homeland Security, the weapon works:

"By simultaneously overwhelming the subject both physiologically (temporarily blinding him) and psychophysically (disorienting him). A built-in range finder measures the distance to the nearest pair of eyeballs. Then, a "governor" sets the output and pulse train (a series of pulses and rests) to a level, frequency, and duration that are effective, but safe. The colors and pulses continuously change, leaving no time for the brain or eyes to adapt. After a few minutes, the effects wear off."

The manufacturer, Intelligent Optical Systems (IOS), was awarded an $800,000.00 contract by the United States Department of Homeland Security's Small Business Innovation Research Office. As of August, 2007, the first phase of the contract, which called for the development of a prototype, has been completed. Later phases involve the testing of the prototype by the Institute of Nonlethal Defense at Pennsylvania State University, and the development of a production version, planned to be more compact and easier to carry.

Bob Lieberman, president of IOS, said he envisions the device being used in "confrontations at border crossings with suspected illegal aliens or drug runners" among other possibilities. Projected users include "air marshals, border patrol agents, other officers with the Transportation Security Administration and customs officers" according to Gerald Kirwin of IOS. "In that few seconds, the officer has a tactical advantage and will actually close in to subdue or control the potential adversary," Lieberman said. The device can be used from ranges of up to 30 feet, while other non-lethal devices require an officer to approach the target much more closely, according to Lieberman.

Glenn Shwaery, a researcher in nonlethal technology at the University of New Hampshire, said "If you disorient or distract somebody and cause them to look away, then they can't focus on their task, which could be aiming a weapon at someone, or looking at a screen with sensitive information, or dialing a phone." Shwaery says that an LED-based device could be safer than a laser-based device intended to achieve the same effects "Getting an eye-safe wavelength with a laser has been very difficult." Shwaery says that the presence of a range-finder and circuitry to modify the intensity of the light depending on the range in the LED device increases its safety. "The ideal goal for nonlethal technologies is that they be scalable." It was intended to be released to police, border patrol agents and National Guardsmen by 2010.

== Deficiencies ==
Some test subjects have been completely unaffected by the light, and although the manufacturer makes claims about the product's effectiveness, the CEO of Intelligent Optics, the producer of the device, has commented "I don’t think we've had anyone actually be sick." There is debate over how well the devices work and what their effects are.

== Criticism ==
Some critics have questioned the desirability of developing and deploying such a device for border security use. Deborah Notkin, president of the American Immigration Lawyers Association said: "It gives me pause, particularly in regards to Mexico. Mexico is a very important economic partner of ours. I would imagine that Mexico wouldn't be particularly happy with us using a device that would be more appropriate for criminals, not just for people trying to get across the border who are looking for better opportunities."

Peter Herby, head of the legal division of the "mines-arms unit" at the International Committee of the Red Cross, suggests that such a device may raise many of the same issues as have arisen with laser-based blinding weapons, known as "dazzlers" because of the intense light with which they temporarily or permanently blind people. He also raises the issue of a possible black market in such weapons. "Once they're in the hands of bad guys are the police going to have to wear protective gear to prevent them[selves] from being dazzled?" Herby states that he is not familiar with this specific device.

However Lieberman of IOS said: "We're taking great care to make sure the intensities we're using fall within eye-safe limit. We're doing medically supervised tests."
