= Personnel halting and stimulation response rifle =

American non-lethal laser dazzler prototype

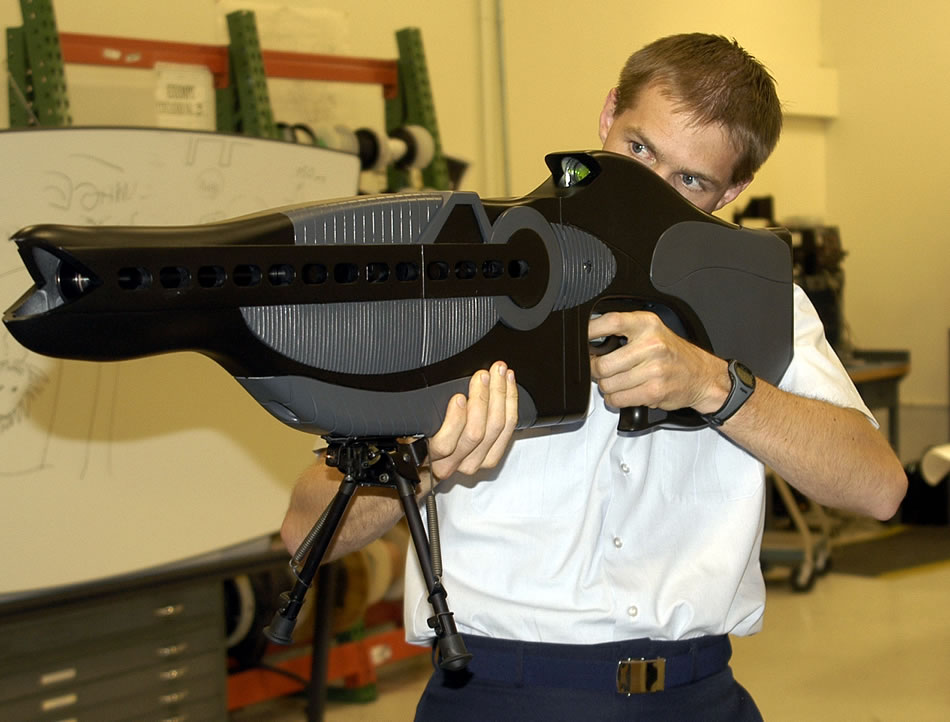
PHASR Rifle

The personnel halting and stimulation response rifle (PHASR) is a prototype non-lethal laser dazzler developed by the Air Force Research Laboratory's Directed Energy Directorate, U.S. Department of Defense. Its purpose is to temporarily disorient and blind a target. Blinding laser weapons have been tested in the past, but were banned under the 1995 UN Protocol on Blinding Laser Weapons, which the United States acceded to on 21 January 2009. The PHASR rifle, a low-intensity laser, is not prohibited under this regulation, as the blinding effect is intended to be temporary. It also uses a two-wavelength laser. The PHASR was tested at Kirtland Air Force Base, part of the Air Force Research Laboratory Directed Energy Directorate in New Mexico.

== See also ==
- Veiling-glare laser
- Directed-energy weapon
