= Military doctrine of Russia =

Strategic planning document of the Russia

The military doctrine of Russia is a strategic planning document of the Russian Federation, representing a system of official state-adopted views on preparation and usage of the Russian Armed Forces. The most recent revision of the military doctrine was approved in 2014.

Numerous successive revisions of military doctrine have been promulgated since 1990. These have included the military doctrines of May 1992 (in draft form), November 1993, and January 2000, as well as the two National Security Concepts of December 1997 and October 1999. Military doctrine in the Russian sense, however, extends beyond discussion of potential threats. In Christopher Donnelly's words, it forms part of "a set of views, accepted in a country at a given time, which cover the aims and character of possible war, the preparations of the country and its armed forces for such war, and the methods of waging it."

== 1992 draft ==
The 1992 draft doctrine showed that first Russian thoughts on external threats were little more than a replica of Soviet thinking. The document stated that while the threat of a world war had declined significantly, the 'sources of military danger' in international relations remained the same as under the USSR.

The first of those "sources of military danger" was given as: "the eagerness of single States or coalitions of states to dominate in the world community or in individual regions, and their predilection for settling matters in dispute by military means".

There could be little doubt that the General Staff, who produced the paper, had the United States and NATO in mind when they wrote this. As slightly further down, it was stated that Russia did not regard any state or coalition as an enemy, a contraction had been introduced between the old and the new, evolving security environment. 'Powerful groupings of armed forces' near Russia's borders, the military build-up of 'certain states', international terrorism, and the proliferation of weapons of mass destruction were also mentioned. Russia also subtlety rescinded its nuclear no first use commitment by indicating that conventional attacks on nuclear weapons, power plants, 'and other potentially dangerous facilities' (presumably chemical or biological sites) would be regarded as the first use of weapons of mass destruction.

== 1993 military doctrine ==
The Supreme Soviet of the Russian SFSR (as it was then) refused to approve the 1992 draft. A new military doctrine only entered into force in November 1993, and was not made fully public; the summary released covered 21 of the 23 pages of the document. No reason was given for the only-partial release of the text, and this gave rise to fears that the Russian Government and/or its military wished to conceal controversial or discreditable intentions.

The summary released showed major differences from the external threats thinking of the 1992 draft. Two main threads showed through the list. Firstly was the remaining threat from the West, exemplified by worries over expansion of military blocs and violation of arms accords, as well as with interference with Russians abroad. The no-first-use commitment of nuclear weapons was dropped. Secondly, newer dangers were acknowledged; nearby internal wars, the proliferation of weapons of mass destruction, and terrorism.

In keeping with its emphasis on the threat of regional conflicts, the doctrine called for Russian armed forces that were smaller, lighter, and more mobile, with a higher degree of professionalism and with greater rapid deployment capability. Such change proved extremely difficult to achieve.

== 2000 military doctrine ==
Both in the 1992 draft and in the 1993 official document, a distinction had been drawn between sources of external military danger and immediate military threats. This distinction disappeared in the most recent doctrinal statement, which was first publicised in draft form in October 1999, and then finally approved by Presidential decree in late April 2000.

While numerous changes were made to the document between its draft stage and final form, the section on external military threats remained virtually the same. The first threat is seen as territorial claims upon the Russian Federation and interference in Russian domestic affairs, language drawn directly from the 1993 external dangers section. Secondly mentioned was disregard for Russian concerns in international conflict resolution, and opposition to strengthening Russia as one centre of a multipolar world. The multipolarity reference echos deleted sections from the 1999 draft, where two contradictory tendencies were set out: at one end, a trend toward a unipolar world based on the domination of one superpower - clearly the United States - and the military resolution of key problems, and at the other, a tendency toward the formation of a multipolar world, based on the rule of international law and the equal rights of people and nations.

Certain changes were made in light of the Chechen wars and the Kosovo war.

== 2010 military doctrine ==
Russia's 2010 military doctrine defines itself as strictly defensive. An English-language translation of the Russian text was available as of November 2022 at the Carnegie Endowment for International Peace website.

The doctrine lists 11 actions seen as constituting "external dangers" (опасности, opasnosti, dangers) to the Russian Federation which include:

- striving to give NATO forces global functions, moving NATO infrastructure closer to Russia's borders
- attempt to destabilize the situation in various states and regions and undermine strategic stability
- deployment of foreign military contingents in countries and waters adjacent to Russia and its allies
- deployment of strategic anti-missile defense systems, undermining global stability, and violating the established nuclear balance of forces, the militarization of space, and deployment of non-nuclear precision weapons;
- territorial claims against Russia and its allies and interference in internal affairs
- spread of weapons of mass destruction, missiles and missile technology, increase in the number of nuclear states
- violation by some states of international agreements and non-compliance with previously concluded arms limitation and reduction treaties
- use of military force in adjacent states in violation of the UN Charter and other international legal norms
- presence of sources and escalation of military conflict in territories adjacent to Russia and its allies
- spread of international terrorism
- occurrence of sources of inter-ethnic (inter-faith) tensions, activity of international armed radical groups in areas adjacent to Russia and its allies, growth of separatism and forcible extremism in various regions of the world

It also lists five actions seen as constituting military threats:

- a sharpening of the military-political situation and creation of conditions for the use of military force
- hindrance of the working of the state and military command and control system, interference in the functioning of its strategic nuclear forces, missile attack warning systems, space monitoring systems, nuclear warhead storage facilities, nuclear power and other potentially dangerous facilities
- creation and training of illegal armed formations and their activity on Russian territory or that of its allies
- demonstration of force in the course of conducting exercises in states adjacent to Russia or its allies with provocative intent
- activation of military forces in various states with the conduct of partial or full mobilization and transition to wartime footing

Under the new doctrine, Russia continues to develop and modernize its nuclear capability. "Russia reserves the right to use nuclear weapons in response to the use of nuclear and other types of weapons of mass destruction against it or its allies, and also in case of aggression against Russia with the use of conventional weapons when the very existence of the state is threatened." Most military analysts believe that, in this case, Russia would pursue an 'escalate to de-escalate’ strategy, initiating limited nuclear exchange to bring adversaries to the negotiating table. Russia will also threaten nuclear conflict to discourage initial escalation of any major conventional conflict.

== 2014 military doctrine ==
The next revision of the military doctrine was issued on 26 December 2014. (Note: It was approved by President Vladimir Putin on 25 December 2014.) An English-language translation was available on a Russian government website as recently as November 2022.

A list of scenarios under which Russia would be motivated to act militarily towards other countries is included. All actions seen as particularly threatening and necessary of Russian governmental response are laid out in the doctrine, as confirmed by Russian political journalist Sergey Parkhomenko. Eleven actions are listed that would potentially incite turmoil and military engagement, ultimately presenting Russia on the defensive. In Part II of the doctrine, there are fourteen listed "external military risks" to Russia. These include, as stated directly in the doctrine:

- Build-up of the power potential of the North Atlantic Treaty Organization (NATO) and vesting NATO with global functions carried out in violation of the rules of international law, bringing the military infrastructure of NATO member countries near the borders of the Russian Federation, including by further expansion of the alliance;
- Destabilization of the situation in individual states and regions and undermining of global and regional stability; deployment (build-up) of military contingents of foreign states (groups of states) in the territories of the states contiguous with the Russian Federation and its allies, as well as in adjacent waters, including for exerting political and military pressure on the Russian Federation;
- Establishment and deployment of strategic missile defense systems undermining global stability and violating the established balance of forces related to nuclear missiles, implementation of the global strike concept, intention to place weapons in outer space, as well as deployment of strategic non-nuclear systems of high-precision weapons;
- Territorial claims against the Russian Federation and its allies and interference in their internal affairs;
- Proliferation of weapons of mass destruction, missiles and missile technologies;
- Violation of international agreements by individual states, as well as non-compliance with previously concluded international treaties in the field of arms prohibition, limitation and reduction;
- Use of military force in the territories of states contiguous with the Russian Federation and its allies in violation of the UN Charter and other norms of international law;
- Emergence of seats of armed conflict and escalation of such conflicts in the territories of the states contiguous with the Russian Federation and its allies;
- Growing threat of global extremism (terrorism) and its new manifestations under the conditions of insufficiently effective international anti-terrorist cooperation, real threat of terrorist acts with use of radioactive and toxic chemical agents, expansion of transnational organized crime, primarily of illicit arms and drugs trafficking;
- Existence (emergence) of seats of inter-ethnic and inter-confessional tensions, activities of radical international armed groupings and international private military companies in areas adjacent to the state border of the Russian Federation and the borders of its allies, as well as territorial contradictions and upsurge in separatism and extremism in some regions of the world;
- Use of information and communication technologies for the military-political purposes to take actions which run counter to international law, being aimed against sovereignty, political independence, territorial integrity of states and posing threat to the international peace, security, global and regional stability;
- Establishment of regimes, which policies threaten the interests of the Russian Federation in the states contiguous with the Russian Federation, including by overthrowing legitimate state administration bodies;
- Subversive operations of special services and organizations of foreign states and their coalitions against the Russian Federation.

The doctrine lists a variety of military actions, including the “implementation of the global strike concept” and the “intention to place weapons in outer space.” It also states one of the main tasks of the Russian military is to “resist attempts by some states or group of states to achieve military superiority through the deployment of strategic missile defense systems, the placement of weapons in outer space or the deployment of strategic non-nuclear high-precision weapon systems.” Evidence indicates that Russia is actively developing and testing an array of space weapons.

Despite this evidence of Russian space weaponry development, Russia and China sponsored multiple draft resolutions against such activity— "No first placement of weapons in outer space" and "Transparency and confidence building measures in space activities".

In the words of one Polish observer, "State policy and military doctrine are inextricably linked because the competent military policy meets all changes in international and domestic situations and successive military reforms are impossible without corresponding reflection in Military Doctrine."

=== Subsidiary doctrine ===
Since the re-issuance of the 2014 document, the Russian government has published the 2015 National Security Strategy, the 2016 Foreign Policy Concept, the 2017 Naval Strategy, and the 2020 Principles of Nuclear Deterrence Strategy, as well as the 2016 Information Security Doctrine.

Putin updated the National Security Strategy on 2 July 2021. This document calls to develop a comprehensive partnership with China and a special strategic partnership with India, so as to ensure stability and security in the Asia-Pacific region.

== See also ==
- Gerasimov doctrine
- New physical principles weapons
- Military history of the Soviet Union
