= M234 launcher =

Launcher, Projectile, 64 mm, Riot Control, M234
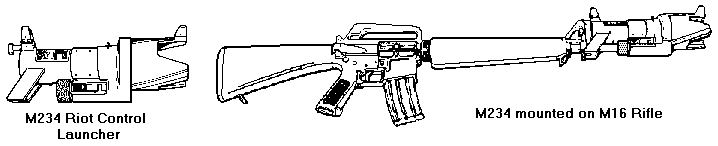
- Type: Less-lethal Weapon
- Place of origin: United States

Service history
- In service: 1978–1995
- Used by: United States

Production history
- Designed: 1973–1978
- Produced: 1978–1987

Specifications
- Cartridge: 1.25 ounce, 64 mm Ring Airfoil Projectile
- Rate of fire: 4 to 6 projectiles per minute
- Muzzle velocity: 200 ft/s (61 m/s)
- Effective firing range: 40 meters individuals, 60 meters small groups
- Maximum firing range: 100 meters
- Feed system: Muzzle Loading

The M234 Riot Control Launcher is an M16 series rifle or M4 series carbine attachment firing a M755 Grenade round. The M234 mounts on the muzzle, bayonet lug and front sight post of the M16. It fires either the M734 64 mm Kinetic Riot Control or the M742 64 mm CSI Riot Control Ring Airfoil Projectiles. The latter produces a 4 to 5 foot tear gas cloud on impact. The launcher is capable of firing from 4 to 6 projectiles per minute. The velocity is sufficiently high to prevent dodging by target individuals at effective ranges. The effective range of the projectile is 40 meters on an individual and 60 meters on groups of individuals with a maximum range of 100 meters. The main advantage to using Ring Airfoil Projectiles is that their design does not allow them be thrown back by rioters with any real effect. The M234 is no longer used by United States forces. It has been replaced by the M203 40mm grenade launcher and nonlethal ammunition.

== Kinetic energy projectile ==
The kinetic energy projectile was designed as an incapacitant. The original design used kinetic and tear gas projectiles for use in the M234 Riot Control Launcher. The design of the kinetic energy projectile is an aerodynamic, circular tube-shaped ring airfoil munition that discharges tear gas on impact and/or uses blunt force trauma to subdue or deter a subject. The main advantage to using kinetic energy projectiles is that their design does not allow them be thrown back by rioters with any real effect.

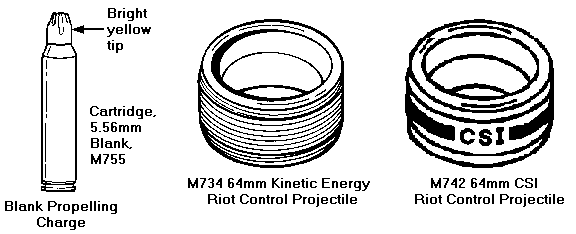

== See also ==
- List of individual weapons of the U.S. Armed Forces
- Riot control
