= Sticky foam =

Type of less-lethal weapon

Sticky foam is a type of less-lethal weapon, consisting of various extremely tacky and/or tenacious materials carried in compressed form with a propellant and used to block, entangle, and impair individuals.

A National Institute of Justice-funded project at Sandia National Laboratory developed a "gun" which could fire multiple shots of sticky foam. After testing the product for corrections applications, Sandia provided the U.S. Marine Corps' Operation United Shield with sticky foam guns and supporting equipment to assist in the withdrawal of U.N. peacekeepers from Somalia. Problems with this technology include: the serious risk of smothering (suffocating) the subject; skin clean-up (the foam may not be toxic, but solvents are often harsh); "gun" clogging; targeting and firing; and gun cleaning. The U.S. Marine Corps reportedly successfully used the sticky foam guns as part of the operation in Somalia.

The sticky foam was mentioned in the bestselling book Men Who Stare at Goats, becoming better known to the general public. It was reportedly invented by U.S. Army Col. John B. Alexander. In an article by WIRED, the United States Army allegedly hired a private company, Adherent Technologies of Albuquerque, a small business contract to develop a "foam-based vehicle arresting system," thought to possibly halt the path of a vehicle through "low-profile containers," described as "each containing enough foam base to generate several cubic meters of high-strength foam." The idea is thought to clog the engine of a car and "absorb the vehicle’s kinetic energy, bringing it to a stop".
