= Dazer Laser =

Dazer Laser is a family of non-lethal, ocular distraction (ocular interrupter) devices, or dazzlers, which have been designed and engineered by Laser Energetics, Inc. (LEI).

== Products ==
There were three products in the Dazer Laser range:

- Defender – a pistol-shaped device with range up to 1,000 metres (3,300 ft).
- Guardian – in flashlight or baton form, a higher power device having a range up to 2,400 metres (7,900 ft).
- Stealth – a multi-function, weapon-mounted attachment that combines optical distractor, visible pointer, infra-red (IR) pointer, IR illuminator, and white LED illuminator into a single unit.

== Technology ==
Most laser dazzlers operate at a fixed divergence, causing long-range models to be unsafe at shorter distances. Dazer Laser products utilize patent-pending "Variable Range & Focus Optics" which allow the operator to adjust accordingly depending on the range of the engagement. For instance if someone is 5 meters away, the user sets the range to 5 meters and is safe to engage from 1 meter up to 5 meters away. In the event a threat is 50 meters away, the user changes the range to the 50 meter setting and now can engage the threat eye-safe from 10 meters and beyond. Other dazzling devices may have built-in safety modules that turn the device off inside of short ranges, making them effective only at long range.

Dazer Lasers use a "GreenStar Laser" (US Patent and Trademark Office provisional patent application no. 61/348,312), which is a diode-pumped solid-state (DPSS), 532 nm (green), Class IIIb laser that produces maximum power of over 750 mW without having to increase the same laser's size. The GreenStar laser provides a simultaneous mix of pulse-width modulation and continuous wave (CW) operation for both day and night modes without overheating, unlike other dazzling devices that need to be operated pulsed to conserve power for cooling reasons.

The mixture of pulsed and continuous light is referred to as "MEAN beam", for modulated, erratically pulsed, awareness-inhibiting, and nausea-inducing.

The products have built-in security codes for controlled activation. Once the code has been input into the device, it is activated for a time period of 8, 12, or 24 hours. Upon expiration of the time clock, the device shuts off and cannot be used again until the code is re-entered. This prevents unauthorized use in the event it is lost or stolen.

The Dazer Laser also operates as a high-powered, long range search-light, and is water-proof up to 20 m (2 atm). Both the Defender and Guardian are weapons-mountable using MIL Std 1913 Picatinny Rail adapters and have been ruggedized for transport and gunfire, vibration and shock. All Dazer Laser products are powered by CR 123A-3V lithium batteries, the Defender uses four whilst the Guardian uses two.

== Effects ==
In 2009, The Register quoted a Laser Energetics statement that "the threats vision is temporarily impaired, their balance is effected, [sic] and they become affected by nausea", calling the weapon a "puke-ray" and "chunder-beam". By the end of 2010, LEI's website said that "in some cases, a feeling of nausea may occur, however the Dazer Laser® is not intended to make you sick."

== History ==
2008 - Laser Energetics completes its research and begins the physical engineering of its Dazer Laser."

2009 - Laser Energetics announces its nonlethal laser weapon.

2010 - Results from for the eye safety study proves the Dazer Laser can be operated safely. Dazer Laser first sale is made to Israeli Corrections.

2013 – Dazer Laser Guardian announced to be compliant with US FDA safety standard.

== Slogans ==
LEI claimed trademark on several phrases in relation to Laser Dazer, including:

- Laser Dazer – Light Fighting Technologies
- Non-Lethal – Less Violent
- Saving Lives ... One Daze at a Time
- Bringing Light to the Fight

== See also ==
- List of laser articles
