= New physical principles weapons =

New weapons created using emerging technologies

New physical principles weapons are a wide range of weapons or systems created using emerging technologies, like wave, psychophysical, and genetic weapons.

This definition is similar to "new types of weapons of mass destruction and new systems of such weapons" used in documentation from United Nations General Assembly sessions since 1975 and "non-lethal weapons" used by the North Atlantic Treaty Organization (NATO).

== Definitions ==
=== Weapons using new physical principle ===
The term is currently used primarily in Russia. The Encyclopedia of the Russian Ministry of Defense identifies the following types of new physical principles weapons that have been developed to varying degrees by the 21st century:

- directed energy weapons, like infrasound, laser, and super-high frequency weapons
- electromagnetic weapons, such as some lasers and super-high frequency weapons
- geophysical weapons, including climate, ozone, environmental, and seismic weapons
- genetic weapons
- non-lethal arms
- radiological weapons

=== New weapon of mass destructions ===
New types of "weapons of mass destruction and new systems of such weapons" were defined by the United Nations General Assembly in 1975. In 1976, the US State Department stated that these weapons are based on "qualitatively new principles of action", which can be new due to the nature of the impact, target to be attacked, method of action, or how they are used. Examples given were infrasound weapons designed to damage internal organs and affect human behavior; genetic weapons, the use of which would affect the mechanism of heredity; ray weapons capable of affecting blood and intracellular plasma; robotic military equipment; unmanned controlled aircraft; and weapon systems, like aerospace weapon systems, where nuclear weapons are transported by spaceships and thereby more dangerous.

In the never-adopted draft treaty of 1975, the proposed language in the United Nations Disarmament Conference classification for "new weapons of mass description" to be banned included:

- radiological means of the non-explosive type acting with the aid of radioactive materials
- technical means of inflicting radiation injury based on the use of charged or neutral particles to affect biological targets
- infrasonic means using acoustic radiation to affect biological targets
- means using electromagnetic radiation to affect biological targets.

The Convention on the Prohibition of Military or Any Other Hostile Use of Environmental Modification Techniques of 1977 does not identify specific weapons or technology.

=== Non-lethal weapons ===
NATO definition of non-lethal weapons include new responsive technologies—like lasers, kinetic and acoustic devices. Examples of non-lethal weapons are counter-personnel and radio-frequency vehicle stopping technologies. The United States Department of Defense's current and future non-lethal weapons programs include active denial, counter-personnel capability that creates a heating sensation, quickly repelling potential adversaries with minimal risk of injury in such missions as force protection, perimeter defense, crowd control, patrols/convoys, defensive and offensive operations.

== United Nations conventions ==
New weapons of mass destruction that have harmful effects on people and the ecological balance of the planet are, in essence, criminal and contrary to the Convention on the Prohibition of Military or Any Other Hostile Use of Environmental Modification Techniques of 1977. Rather than identifying specific weapons, the Convention on the Prohibition of Military or Any Other Hostile Use of Environmental Modification Techniques of 1977 prohibits use of "military or any other hostile use of environmental modification techniques having widespread, long-lasting or severe effects as the means of destruction, damage or injury to any other State Party". This includes deliberate actions taken to change the atmosphere, hydrosphere, outer space, or in other ways affect the dynamics, structure or composition of the earth.

The Biological and Toxin Weapons Convention of 1972. The Seventh Review Conference was held in Geneva in December 2011, which resulted in the Final Declaration document that affirmed that "under all circumstances the use of bacteriological (biological) and toxin weapons is effectively prohibited by the Convention". The Protocol on Blinding Laser Weapons, Protocol IV of the 1980 Convention on Certain Conventional Weapons, was issued by the United Nations on October 13, 1995, and came into force on July 30, 1998.

== Weapons development ==
Russian military doctrine refers to new physical principles weapons, while describing the main features of these weapons as comparable in effect to nuclear weapons but more acceptable in political terms. It was reported in October 2016 that Russia had tested a new electronic weapon, based on new physical principles, that uses directed-energy to neutralize on-board aircraft equipment, unmanned combat aerial vehicles, and precision weapons. In November 2016, Putin stated that the new physical principles weapons comply with all of the country's international obligations.

=== Non-lethal blinding weapons ===
In 2015, Russia announced a blinding weapon, Rook, that creates a disabling light interference, which can be used against night-vision equipment. It uses ultraviolet, infrared, and visible regions of the spectrum and can change the width and direction of the beam to target specific objects.

In 2018, Russia announced Peresvet, an anti-satellite blinding laser weapon with a range of 1500 km.

In 2019, Russia announced the 5P-42 Filin, a non-lethal light-based optical jamming system with a range of up to 5 km.

In 2021, Russia announced the Lyutik-N visual-optical interference blinding station with a range of up to 100 meters.

== See also ==
- Active Denial System
- Cyberwarfare
- Hybrid warfare
- Psychological warfare
- High-frequency Active Auroral Research Program
- Sura Ionospheric Heating Facility
- Weather warfare
