= Veiling-glare laser =

The veiling-glare laser is a proposed laser dazzler, a non-lethal weapon which would use light in the ultraviolet (UV) range. The intended effect would be to cause fluorescence in the lens of the eye, producing intense glare and making clear vision impossible. In September 2002, the Joint Nonlethal Weapons Directorate announced the proposal was under development.

It is intended to have three key advantages over previous laser dazzlers which operate in visible wavelengths:

- the power levels used can be lower, so there is in theory less risk of eye damage;
- the location of the laser is not apparent to the target; and
- it has a wide angle of effectiveness.

However, the proposal has been seriously questioned. New Scientist quoted two experts, Tom van den Berg of the Netherlands Ophthalmic Research Institute and Bill Stark of Saint Louis University, as suggesting that at the requisite power levels the use of UV wavelengths is in itself questionable and could damage the lens, almost definitely causing cataracts.

In addition Professor Stark (an expert in the effects of UV light on eyes) questioned whether the idea could work at all: "My experience suggests that such fluorescence does not cause significant amounts of glare."

== See also ==
- Dazzler weapon
