= R.I.P. cartridge =

Specialized less-than-lethal shotgun ammo

The R.I.P. cartridge (round irritant personnel) 12-gauge ammunition comprises cartridges filled with a mixture of micronized CS gas, an inert powder to add weight, and a further non-toxic powder which, on compression and friction, produces a large amount of carbon dioxide gas on exiting the barrel of the shotgun.

These specialist rounds are used in situations such as hostage rescue, where a less-than-lethal approach is required in order to resolve an incident.

Persons subject to the dispersed contents of an R.I.P. round will be incapacitated for a given amount of time, depending on the precise content of the round.

On 9 June 2008 English firearms officer PC Ian Terry was accidentally shot at point-blank range and killed by an R.I.P. round, in this instance filled with an inert white powder rather than CS gas, fired by a colleague whilst on a training exercise.
