= Non-lethal weapon =

Weapon less likely to kill a target

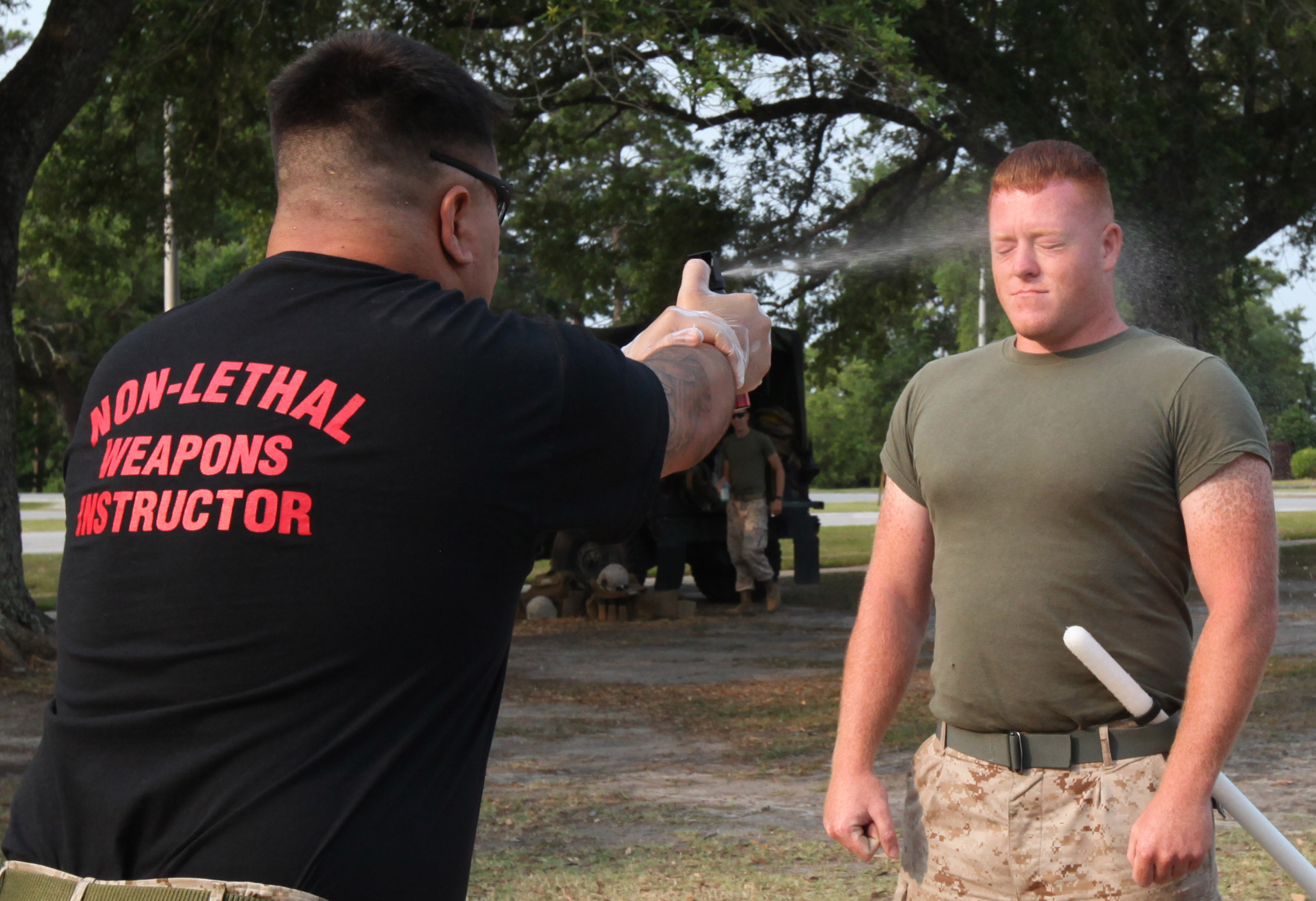
An instruction on oleoresin capsicum (pepper spray) at Marine Corps Base Camp Lejeune

Non-lethal weapons, also called nonlethal weapons, less-lethal weapons, less-than-lethal weapons, non-deadly weapons, compliance weapons, or pain-inducing weapons are weapons intended to be less likely to kill a living target than conventional weapons such as knives and firearms with metal-projectile ammunition. It is often understood that unintended or incidental casualties are risked wherever force is applied; however, non-lethal weapons minimise the risk of casualties (e.g. serious/permanent injuries or death) as much as possible. Non-lethal weapons are used in policing and combat situations to limit the escalation of conflict where employment of lethal force is prohibited or undesirable, where rules of engagement require minimum casualties, or where policy restricts the use of conventional force. However, these weapons occasionally cause serious injuries or death due to allergic reactions, improper use and/or other factors; for this reason the term "less-lethal" has been preferred by some organizations as it describes the risks of death more accurately than the term "non-lethal", which some have argued is a misnomer.

Non-lethal weapons may be used by conventional military in a range of missions across the force continuum. They may also be used by military police, by United Nations forces, and by occupation forces for peacekeeping and stability operations. Non-lethal weapons may also be used to channelize a battlefield, control the movement of civilian populations, or to limit civilian access to restricted areas (as they were utilized by the USMC's 1st Marine Expeditionary Force in Somalia in 1995). Similar weapons, tactics, techniques and procedures are employed by police forces domestically in riot control, prisoner control, crowd control, refugee control, and self-defense, where the terminology of "less-than-lethal" is often used.

== History ==
=== Military ===
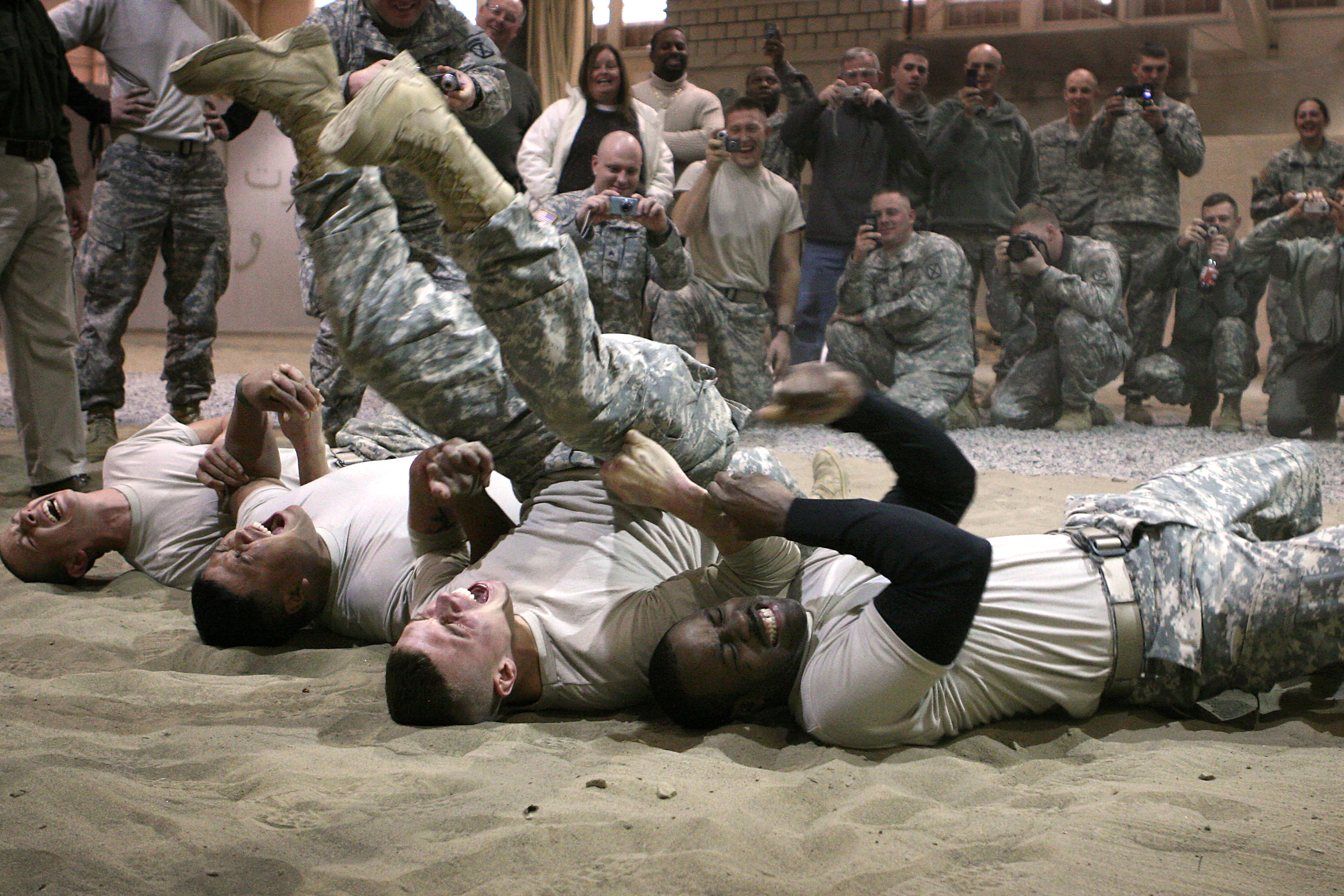
Demonstration of the use of a Taser gun on US military personnel. The device was originally developed for use by civilian police.

In the past, military and police faced with undesirable escalation of conflict had few acceptable options. Military personnel guarding embassies often found themselves restricted to carrying unloaded weapons. National guards or policing forces charged with quelling riots were able to use only batons or similar club-like weapons, or bayonet or sword charges, or fire live ammunition at crowds. In the late 1980s and early 1990s, the Non-lethality Policy Review Group at U.S. Global Strategy Council in Washington and other independent think tanks around the world called for a concerted effort to develop weapons that were more life-conserving, environmentally friendly, and fiscally responsible than weapons available at that time. The U.S. Congress and other governments agreed and began an organized development of non-lethal weapons to provide a range of options between talking and shooting.

Recognizing the need to limit the escalation of force, research and development of a range of non-lethal weapons has since been undertaken internationally by governments and weapons manufacturers to fill the need for such weapons. Some non-lethal weapons may provide more effective riot control than firearms, truncheons or bayonets with less risk of loss of life or serious injury. Before the general availability of early military non-lethal weapons in the mid 1990s, war-fighters had few or no casualty-limiting options for the employment of scalable force and were continually at risk whenever lethal force was prohibited during sensitive missions.

In 2001, the United States Marine Corps revealed its development of a less-than-lethal energy weapon called the Active Denial System, a focused high frequency microwave device said to be capable of heating all living matter in the target area rapidly and continuously for the duration of the beam, causing transient intolerable pain but no lasting damage. The skin temperature of a person subjected to this weapon can jump to approximately 130 °F (54 °C) in as little as 2 seconds depending on the skin's starting temperature. The system is nonlethal (the penetration of the beam into human skin is only a few millimeters).

In 2004, author Jon Ronson cited an unclassified military report titled "Non-Lethal Weapons: Terms and References" 21 acoustic weapons were listed, in various stages of development, including the Infrasound ("Very low-frequency sound which can travel long distances and easily penetrate most buildings and vehicles ... biophysical effects are projected to be: nausea, loss of bowels, disorientation, vomiting, potential internal organ damage or death may occur. Superior to ultrasound...)", however no such effects had been achieved as of 2002.

In 2010, the Joint Non-Lethal Weapons Directorate Non-Lethal Weapons Reference Book was created. The weapons in this book are currently in development.

=== Police ===
Until the development of non-lethal weapons, police officers around the world had few if any non-lethal options for riot control. Common tactics used by police that were intended to be non-lethal or less lethal included a slowly advancing wall of men with batons, officers on horses trained to deal with policing situations, or a charge into a riot using the flats of sabers. Other reasonably successful approaches included shotguns with lower-powered cartridges, "salt shells", using bean-bag rounds and ricocheting shots off of the ground. In the mid-20th century, with the integration of fire-control systems into major cities, police found that high-pressure fire hoses could be effective in dispersing a crowd (the use of water cannons and fire trucks has remained an effective non-lethal tactic to disperse riots). Trained police dogs were also commonly used to scare and disperse rioters and apprehend individuals. In the 1980s the development of high-tensile plastics like Kevlar and Lexan revolutionized personal armor and shields, and led to new tactics for riot squads and other special-purpose teams. Officers could now stand up against violent rioters throwing dangerous projectiles without having to resort to lethal methods to quickly disperse the danger. Coupled with the introduction of effective non-lethal chemical agents such as tear gas and offensive-odor canisters, and non-lethal impact rounds such as rubber bullets and "bean bag" flexible baton rounds, riot tactics were modified to rely less on violent response to attacking rioters than on a return to the slowly advancing wall, with supporting officers firing non-lethal ordnance into the crowd to discourage advance.

Police officers on patrol were traditionally armed with batons or pistols or both, and non-lethal methods of subduing an attacker centered on hand-fighting techniques such as jujutsu and baton use. In the 1980s and 1990s officers began deploying non-lethal personal sidearms such as pepper sprays, and eventually electroshock weapons such as tasers, which were developed for use by police and also found a market in self-defense by private citizens. However, these weapons were developed for non-lethal resolution of one-on-one conflicts.

During the 1990s and early 2000s (decade), interest in various other forms of less-than-lethal weapons for military and police use rose. Amongst other factors, the use of less-than-lethal weapons may be legal under international law and treaty in situations where weapons such as aerosol sprays or gases defined as chemical are not.

Between the years of 1987–1990, after a three-year field study by the FBI's Firearms Training Unit; In 1990, the use of oleoresin capsicum was approved and used by the FBI, the first official law enforcement agency to do so.

In the late 1990s and early 2000s (decade), police began to adopt a new pepper spray delivery system based on the equipment used in paintball. A specialized paintball, called a "pepperball", is filled with liquid or powdered capsaicin, the active ingredient in pepper spray, and is propelled by compressed gas using a paintball marker similar to those used for the sport but operating at a higher pressure. The impact of the capsule is immediately painful (a pepperball's shell is thicker than a standard paintball and is fired at a higher velocity), and it breaks open on impact, dispersing the capsaicin with similar effect to aerosol-delivered pepper spray. However, to be most effective, pepper spray must contact the eyes, nose, or mouth of the target; pepper spray on clothing or tougher skin has a much reduced effect.

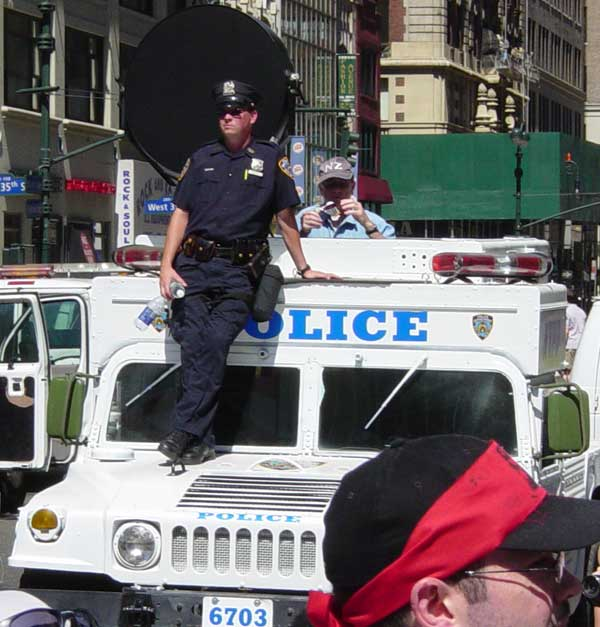
Long-range acoustic device mounted on NYPD vehicle during the 2004 Republican National Convention, New York City

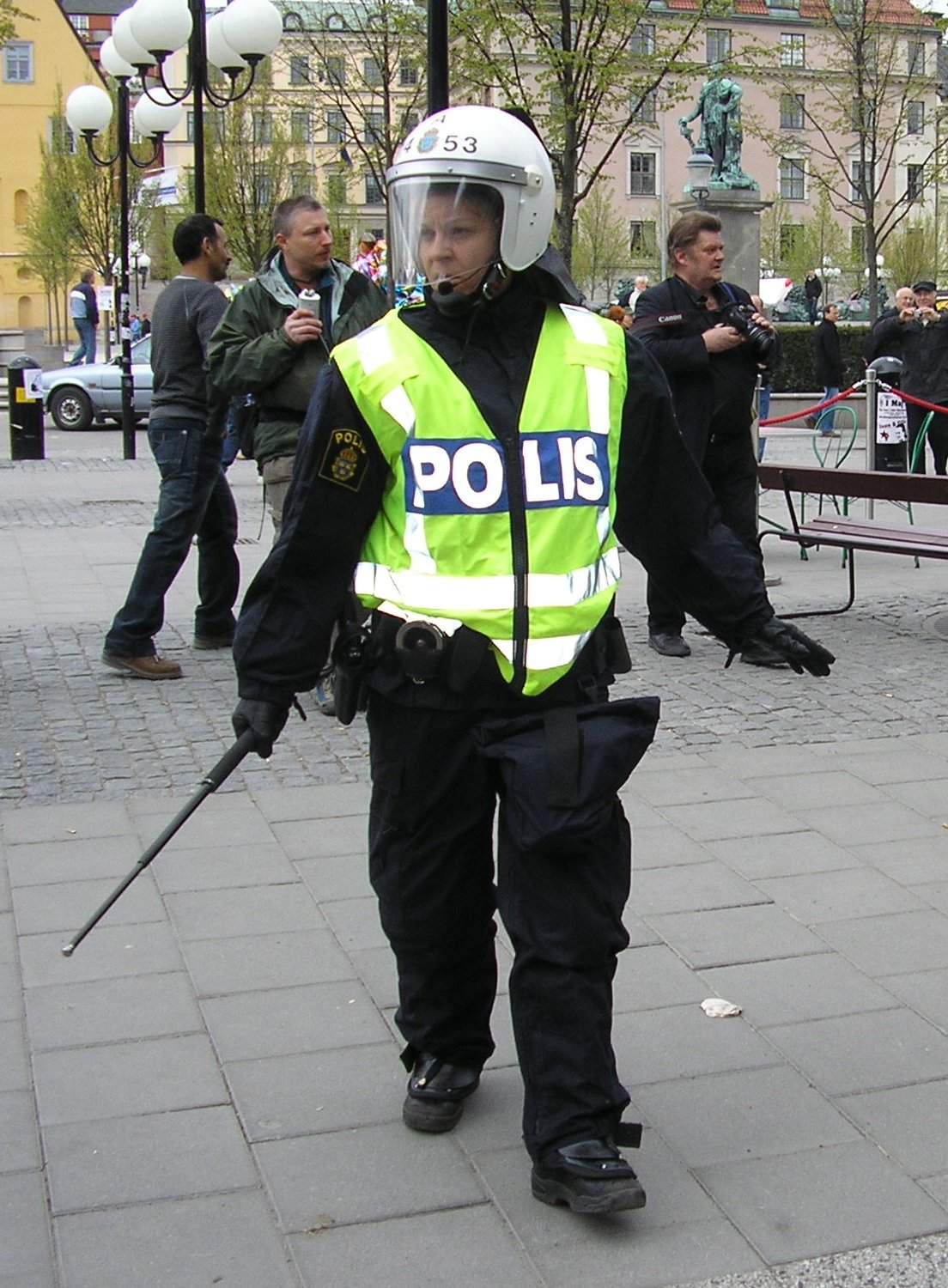
Swedish police in riot gear, carrying an extended telescopic baton

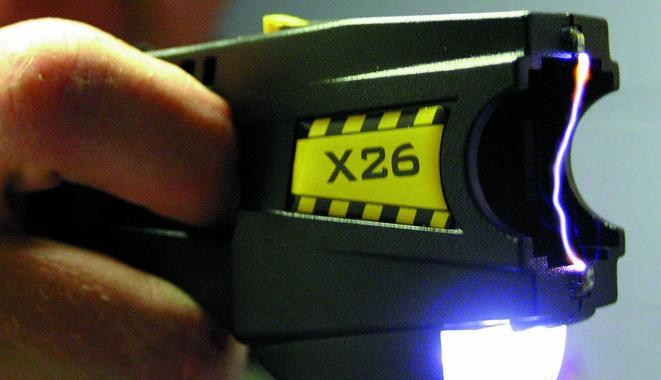
A Taser X26 making an electrical arc between its two electrodes

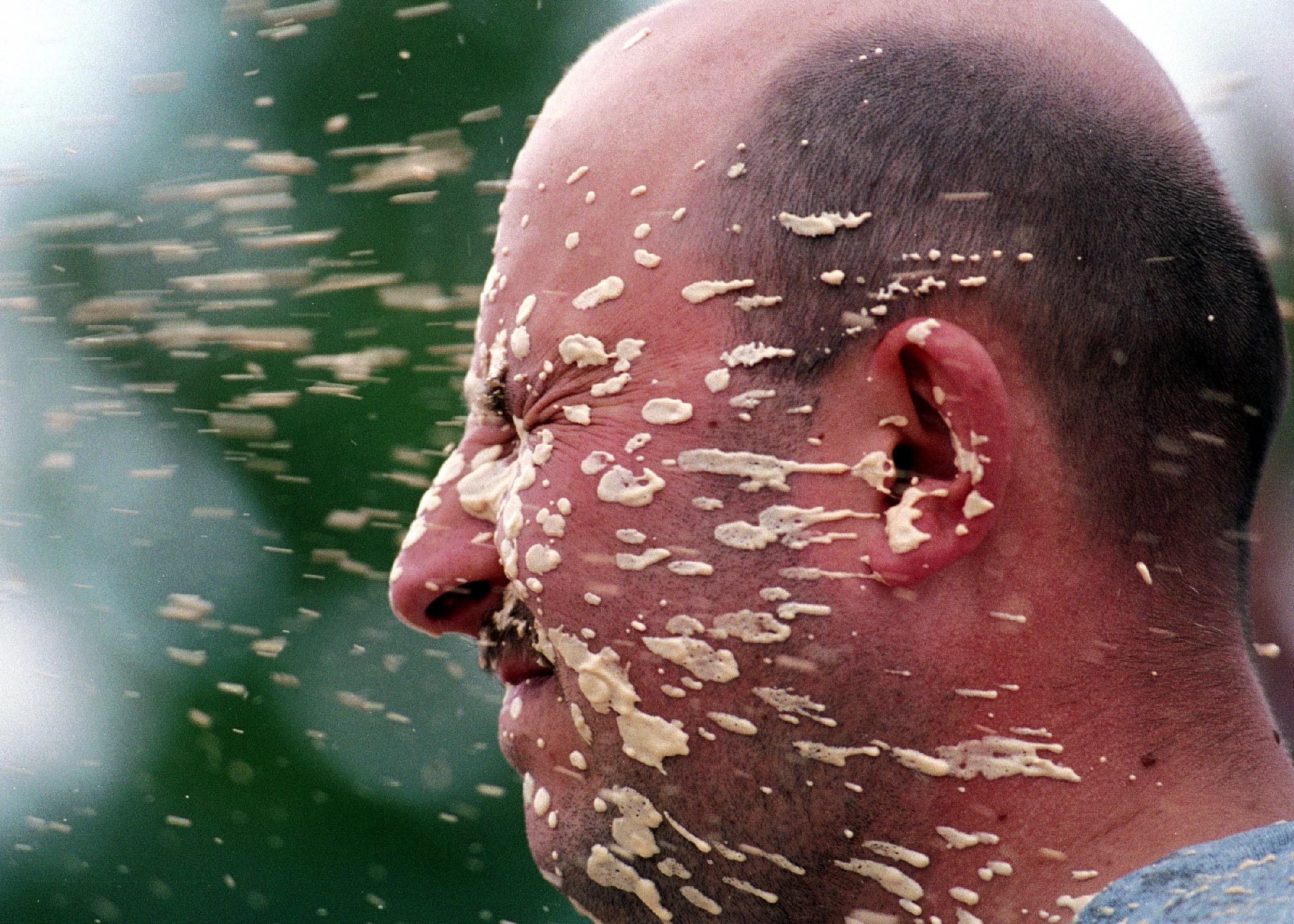
Pepper spray training

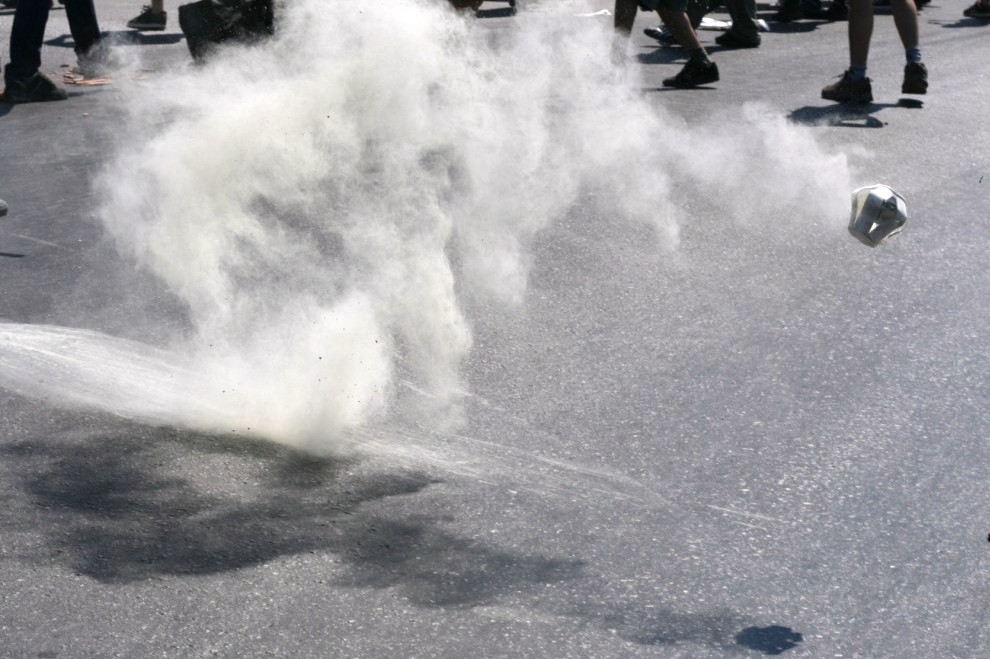
Exploded tear gas canister in the air

== Effects ==
Non-lethal weapons have a design intent to provide an effect to reliably elicit a degree of incapacitation but without the typically lethal or permanent lasting effects of conventional weapons. This design intent has often made them a weapon of choice for use by law enforcement during civil protests, etc. Effect modalities vary by the technology being employed: kinetic projectiles function by blunt impact which actuate pain receptors to elicit a behavioral change, lights affect visual perception, acoustics affect hearing, etc.

Notwithstanding their design intent, non-lethal weapons can still cause harm. This is particularly true with certain technologies that interact with appropriately vulnerable regions; an example is kinetic munitions on the head, neck, eyes, abdominal and urogenital regions of the body. As a result, some analysts describe "non-lethal" as a misnomer and recommend defining them as "less-lethal", whereas other sources identify "non-lethal" as representing a goal of minimization of producing fatalities or permanent injuries while not literally requiring minimization to a zero probability thereof.

== Mechanics ==
Non-lethal weapons are intended to minimize injury or death. While people are occasionally seriously injured or killed by these weapons, fatalities are relatively infrequent. Causes of death from non-lethal weapons are varied and occasionally uncertain. Misplaced or ricocheting shots, pre-existing medical conditions, inadequate user training, repetitive applications and intentional misuse have been implicated in different cases where death has occurred.

As different parts of the body differ in vulnerability, and because people vary in weight and fitness, any weapon powerful enough to incapacitate may be capable of killing under certain circumstances. Thus, "non-lethal force" does have some risk of causing death: in this context, "non-lethal" means only "not intended to kill".

Several groups maintain there is great room for improvement in non-lethal weapons and procedures for their use. Claims for the relative safety of such weapons are usually contingent on their being used "properly". For example, the rubber bullets developed during the 1960s were supposed to be fired at the ground and hit the target only after ricochet, and other non-lethal bullets are designed to be fired at the lower body; they can be lethal if fired directly at the head.

== Ammunition ==
Non-lethal rounds are firearm rounds which are designed to incapacitate, but not kill, a target. The rounds rely on the transfer of kinetic energy and blunt force trauma to accomplish this incapacitation. Rubber bullets, rubber buckshot, soft polymer rounds, wax bullets, plastic bullets, beanbag rounds, sponge grenades, ring airfoil projectiles (both kinetic and tear gas projectiles) and rubber bullets with electroshock effect (e.g. Taser XREP rounds) are less lethal than conventional metal bullets, and are also propelled at lower speed by using less propellant. "Bean bag" type bullets are sometimes referred to as flexible baton rounds. More recently, high-velocity paintball guns are also used to launch less-lethal rounds, including the FN 303 launcher and PepperBall commercial products. There is also the Variable Velocity Weapon Concept, for which a propulsion energy source may not yet have been clearly established and/or finalized. In any case, all of these technologies apply the same basic mechanism, which is to launch a mass at the target that interacts kinetically.

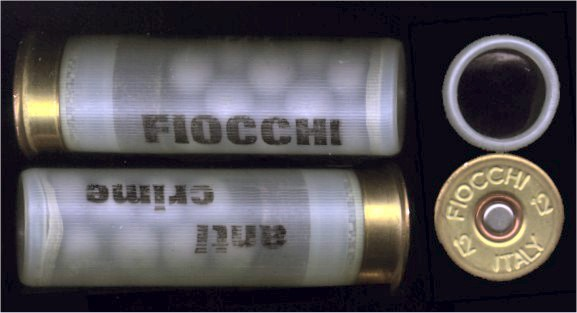
Fiocchi 12-gauge rubber buckshot: containing 15, 8.3 mm, .58 gram rubber pellets, with a muzzle velocity of 790 fps.

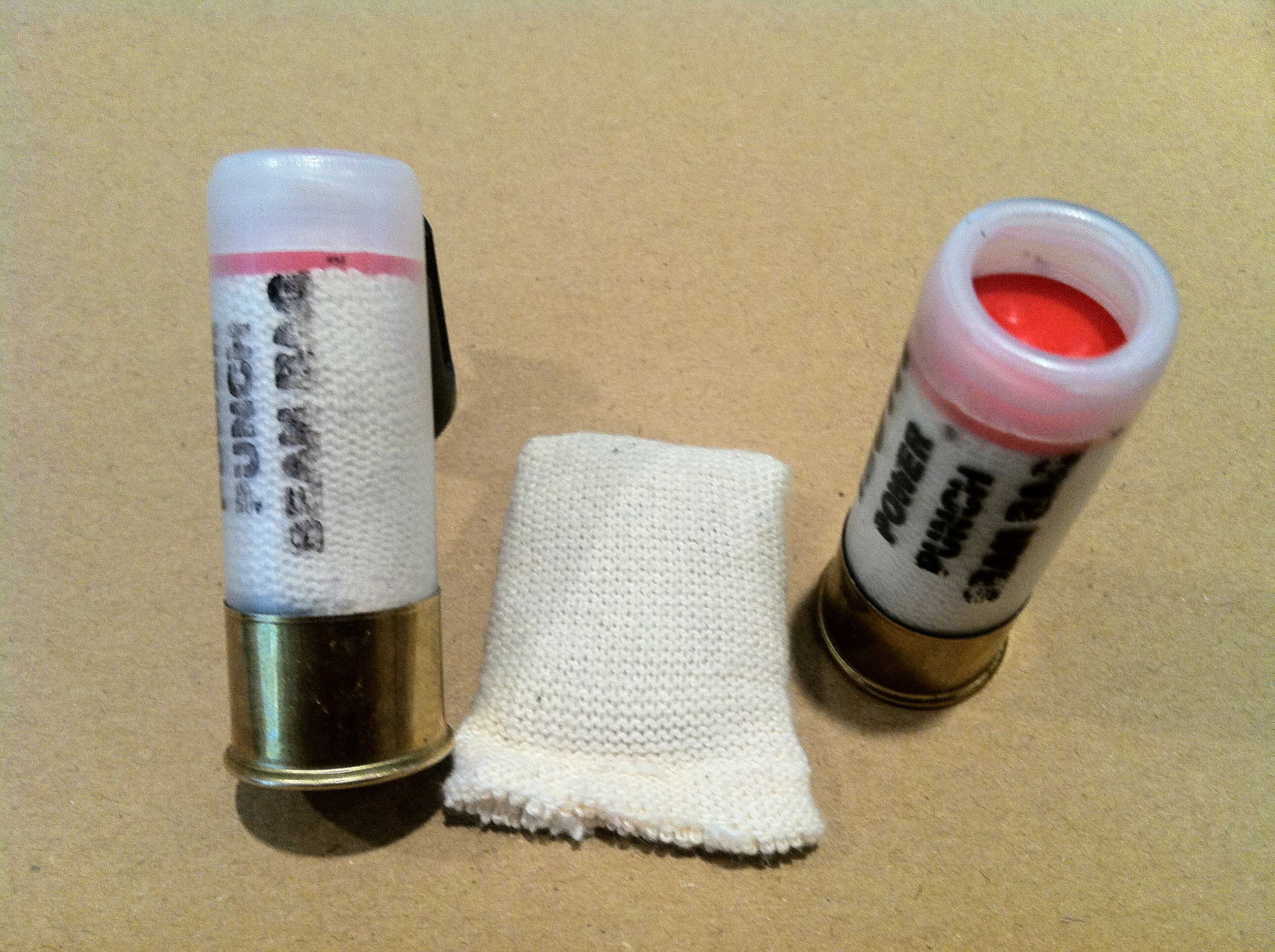
12-gauge beanbag rounds and exposed bean bag round projectile

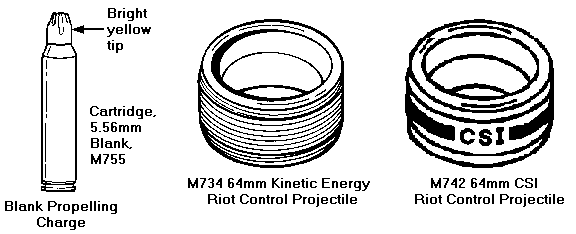
U.S. M234 launcher ring airfoil projectile rounds

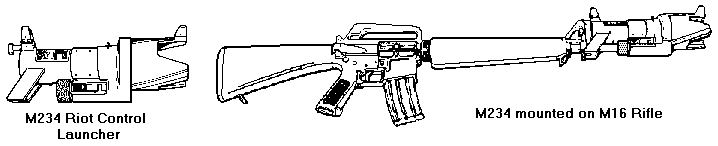
Launcher, projectile, 64 mm, riot control, M234

== Explosives ==
Hand grenades come in several less-lethal varieties, such as "flashbang" (stun) grenades, "sting" grenades with rubber shrapnel, and grenades designed to release chemical irritants (described below).

In 1972, stun grenades were used to capture the hijacked Sabena Flight 571, allowing the Israeli forces headed by Ehud Barak and including Benjamin Netanyahu to storm the plane and take it over within 10 minutes. They captured two terrorists and killed Ali Taha, the leader of the terrorist group, and his aide, while rescuing all passengers (three were wounded and one died of her injuries several days later).

A stun grenade was apparently used by members of the IHH against the IDF soldiers during the 2010 Gaza flotilla raid at the beginning of the IDF storming of the Mavi Marmara.

In June 2010, in Kenya, a stun grenade was used to draw attention, and then a real grenade along with an explosive package were used, killing many people. In April, during the 2010 Kyrgyzstani uprising, police attempted to use stun grenades to stop a demonstration but the crowd overwhelmed the police. In March stun grenades were used by Belarusian police in Minsk against demonstrators, and in September they were used by Greek police in Athens. In these latter two cases, the demonstrations were dispersed with no injuries.

In February 2011, stun grenades were seen used by Egyptian police against rioters.

== Gases and sprays ==
=== Water ===
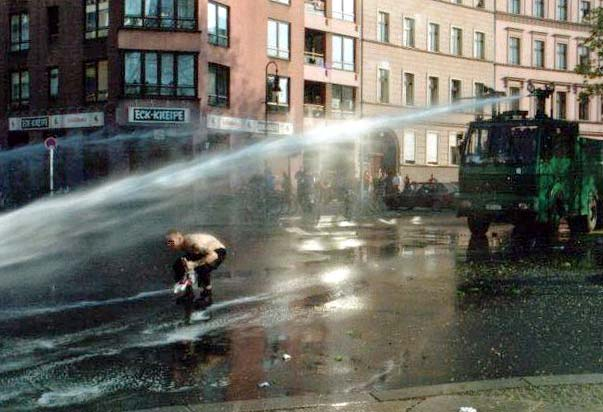
Water cannon during a German demonstration, 2001

Water cannons are commonly used in crowd and riot control, for dispersal or to prevent movement on a particular position. These water cannons are intended to disperse crowds with little risk of harm, but the pressure can still cause eye injuries or even death. Water-filled rounds for small arms are in experimental stages. Electrified water cannons were in development but were abandoned.

=== Scent-based weapons ===
Malodorants produce strong odours that cause people to leave the affected area. In 2008, the Israeli Defence Forces began using Skunk for crowd control. It is a form of mist sprayed from a water cannon, which leaves a terrible odor of rot or sewage on whatever it touches, and does not wash off easily.

=== Pepper spray ===
The active ingredient in pepper spray is oleoresin capsicum (OC), an acrid irritant chemical derived from cayenne pepper plants.

A 1998 estimate by the International Association of Chiefs of Police suggested at least 113 pepper spray-related fatalities had occurred in the United States, all with aggravating factors such as intoxication, pre-existing health problems, or from the police use of airway-restrictive immobilizing holds that can cause positional asphyxia. The Southern California chapter of the American Civil Liberties Union recommends against maximal prone restraint techniques following pepper spray application, and they caution that anyone sprayed should be monitored to ensure effective breathing.

=== Tear gas ===
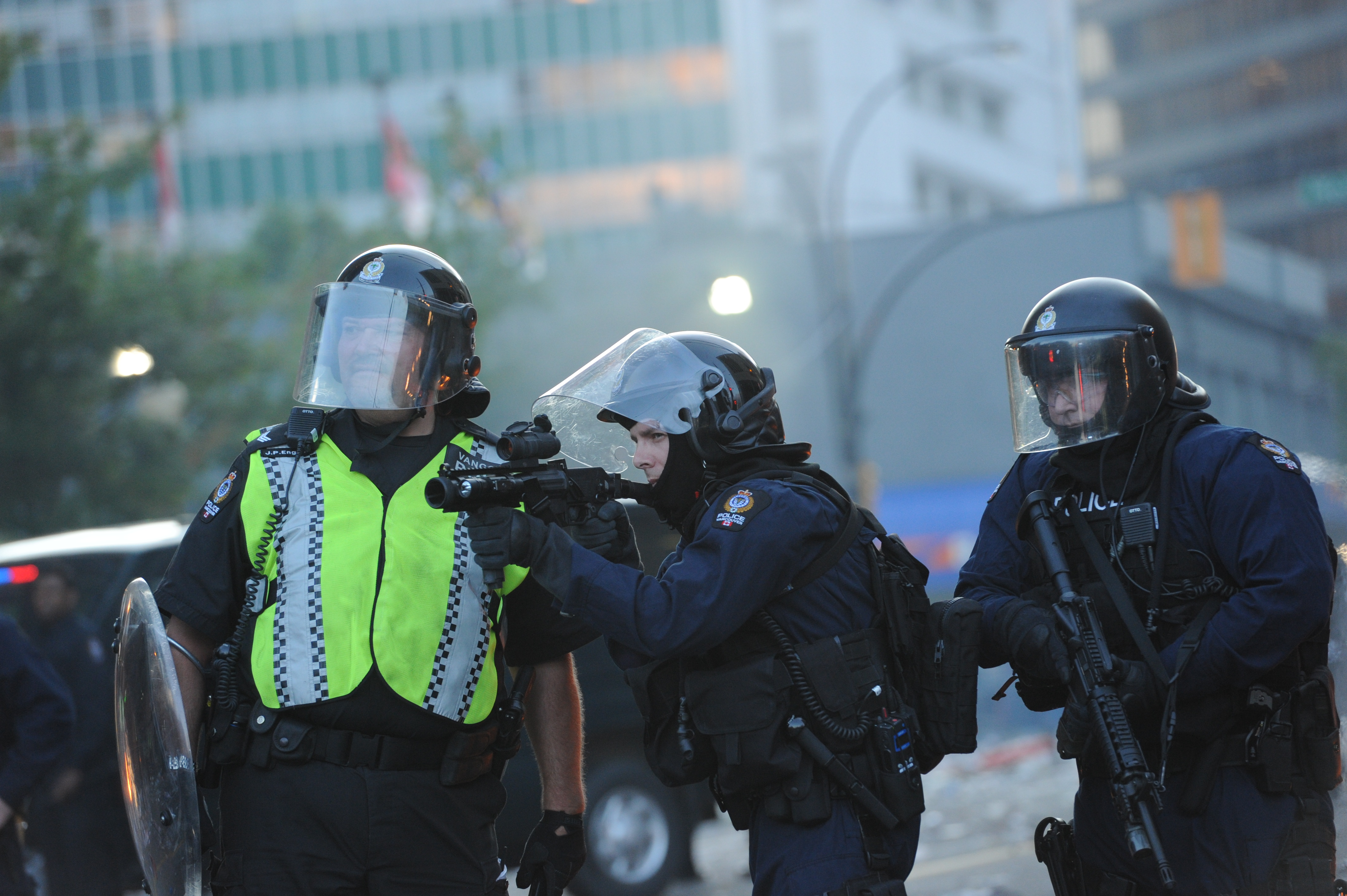
Vancouver Police Department officers in anti-riot gear and armed with tear gas grenade launchers confront Stanley Cup rioters.

The use of chemical weapons such as tear gas (CS) and pepper spray (OC) has come under increasing scrutiny and criticism due to studies showing serious long term side effects. Many police forces are no longer exposing their members to the chemicals during training.

Journalist Rubén Salazar was killed in Los Angeles in 1970 by an errant CS gas canister during the Chicano riots. Other serious injuries and fatalities have occurred from either tear gas itself or the projectiles it is delivered in, including the critical injury of veteran Scott Olsen from a tear gas canister during the 2011 Occupy Oakland protests. Tear gas canisters can also cause fire, as happened in Paris during the Bloquons tout movement.

=== Psychochemical ===
Psychochemical weapons are psychoactive drugs, such as BZ, LSD, Kolokol-1, EA-3167, and 3-Methylamphetamine designed to have a disorienting effect when used during combat or interrogation.

=== Sleep gas ===
During the 2002 Moscow theater hostage crisis, Russian special forces used an unidentified gas (thought to be 3-methylfentanyl or another fentanyl variant dissolved in halothane gas) in an attempt to induce sleep in both hostages and terrorists. Many of the hostages and terrorists (including all of the suicide bombers) were anesthetized, but some terrorists donned gas masks and thus were able to avoid the effects of the gas. Because the agent used was a potent Fentanyl derivative (a synthetic opioid), it causes respiratory depression and ultimately respiratory failure if administered in high enough dosages. The central nervous system effects, such as anesthesia and respiratory depression could have been reversed by an opioid antagonist such as naloxone, which is stocked by hospitals and most ambulances. However, because the Russian authorities did not release any information regarding what type of agent was used, medical professionals were unaware that an opioid had been used during the rescue attempt and thus were unable to administer the antidote which could have saved most hostages. Approximately 700 hostages were rescued, while 130 died from exposure to the gas. All the terrorists were ultimately killed by Russian forces through some combination of gas exposure and gunfire.

=== Other chemical agents ===
Blister agents, including CR gas, are less often used riot control agents. Other irritants include CS gas and nonivamide (PAVA).

== Sticky foam ==
Sticky foam was tried by the U.S. Marine Corps in the peacekeeping Operation United Shield in 1995 with some success, but as a result various complications in its field use were also discovered.

== Area denial ==
Area denial weapons work by either incapacitating or deterring the enemy.

=== Anti-vehicle ===
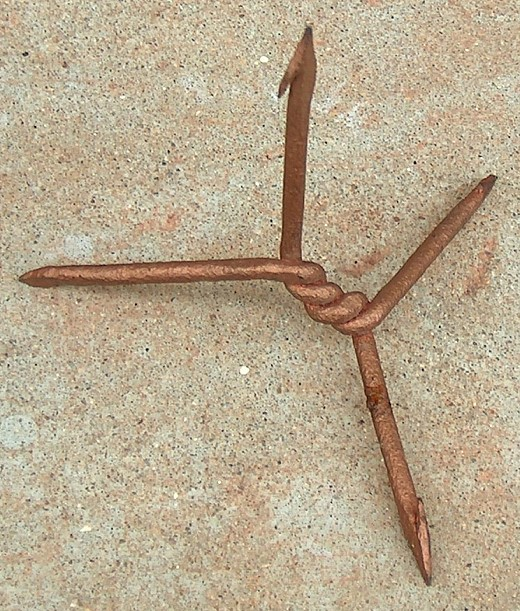
Iron caltrops

Vehicle stoppers include a wide range of methods and devices meant to disable a vessel or vehicle to prevent attack by an oncoming vessel or vehicle or to stop that vessel or vehicle for evaluation. Vessel and vehicle stoppers may include kinetic, chemical, or electromagnetic means.

=== Anti-personnel ===
==== Caltrops ====
Simple rows or clusters of sharpened sticks (also known as punji sticks), and the use of small caltrops have been a feature of anti-infantry warfare for centuries. They are known to have been in use since Roman times and may have been used earlier: the concept was familiar to the 4th century BC Greeks, who used rocks, brush, nets and trees placed in the path of enemy conveyances on land or ensnarement devices hidden under water to achieve the same result: stop the enemy or suspected hostile in his tracks for examination or to prevent or limit incursions. Contemporary caltrops look something like large jacks from the childhood game. Placed in the path of oncoming wheeled or tracked vehicles, they are meant to foul wheels, destroy tires and tracks, and incapacitate vehicles.

However, due to the difficulty of mass-producing them in the pre-modern age, they were rarely used except in the defense of limited areas or chokepoints, especially during sieges, where they were used to help seal breaches. Increasing ease of production still did not prevent these methods from slowly falling out of favor from the late Middle Ages onward.

Caltrops are still sometimes used in modern conflicts, such as during the Korean War, where Chinese troops, often wearing only light shoes, were particularly vulnerable. In modern times, special caltrops are also sometimes used against wheeled vehicles with pneumatic tires. Some South American urban guerrillas as the Tupamaros and Montoneros called them "miguelitos" and used these as a tactic to avoid pursuit after ambushes.

== Riot gun ==
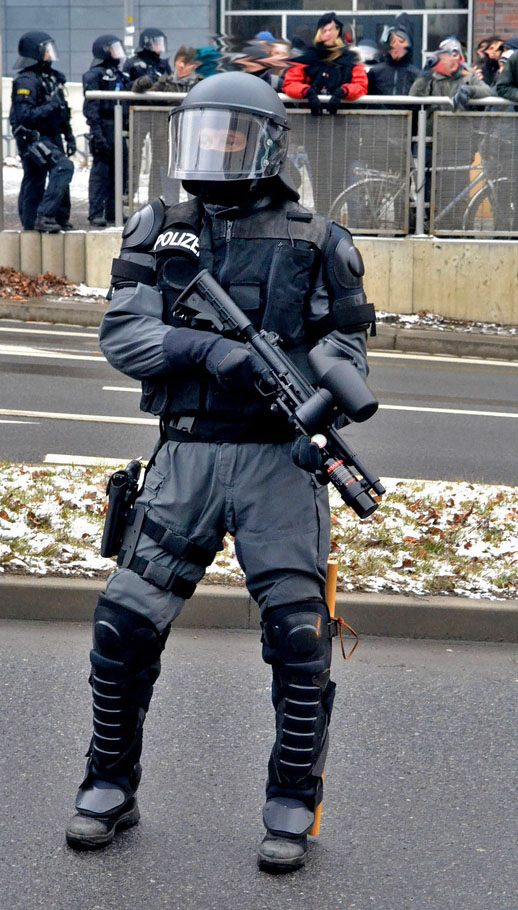
A German policeman with Pepperball gun in Dresden

In current usage a riot gun or less-lethal launcher is a type of firearm that is used to fire "non-lethal" or "less-lethal" ammunition for the purpose of suppressing riots. Less-lethal launchers may be special purpose firearms designed for riot control use, or standard firearms, usually shotguns and grenade launchers, adapted to riot control use with appropriate ammunition. The ammunition is most commonly found in 12 gauge (18.5 mm/.729 inch) shotguns and 37mm (1.46 inch) or 40mm (1.57 inch) grenade launchers.

In the United States, the term "riot gun" more commonly refers to a riot shotgun that shoots baton rounds or bean bag rounds.

In recent years, law enforcement, military and other security organizations sometimes use a type of paintball marker-like weapon that shoot frangible pepper-spray projectiles, which rupture upon impact and release chemical aerosols that irritates the eyes and nose of nearby individuals. Such weapons are used generally in the role of stand-off weapons, where physical proximity to a suspect is deemed dangerous but deadly force is not warranted. The irritant payload may differ from product to product but is usually a capsaicinoid powder called PAVA (capsaicin II), and less frequently a liquid or gas.

== Electroshock weapons ==
Electroshock weapons are incapacitant weapons used for subduing a person by administering electric shock aimed at disrupting superficial muscle functions. One type is a conductive energy device (CED), an electroshock gun popularly known by the brand name "Taser", which fires projectiles that administer the shock through a thin, flexible wire. Other electroshock weapons such as stun guns, stun batons, and electroshock belts administer an electric shock by direct contact.

== Directed energy weapons ==
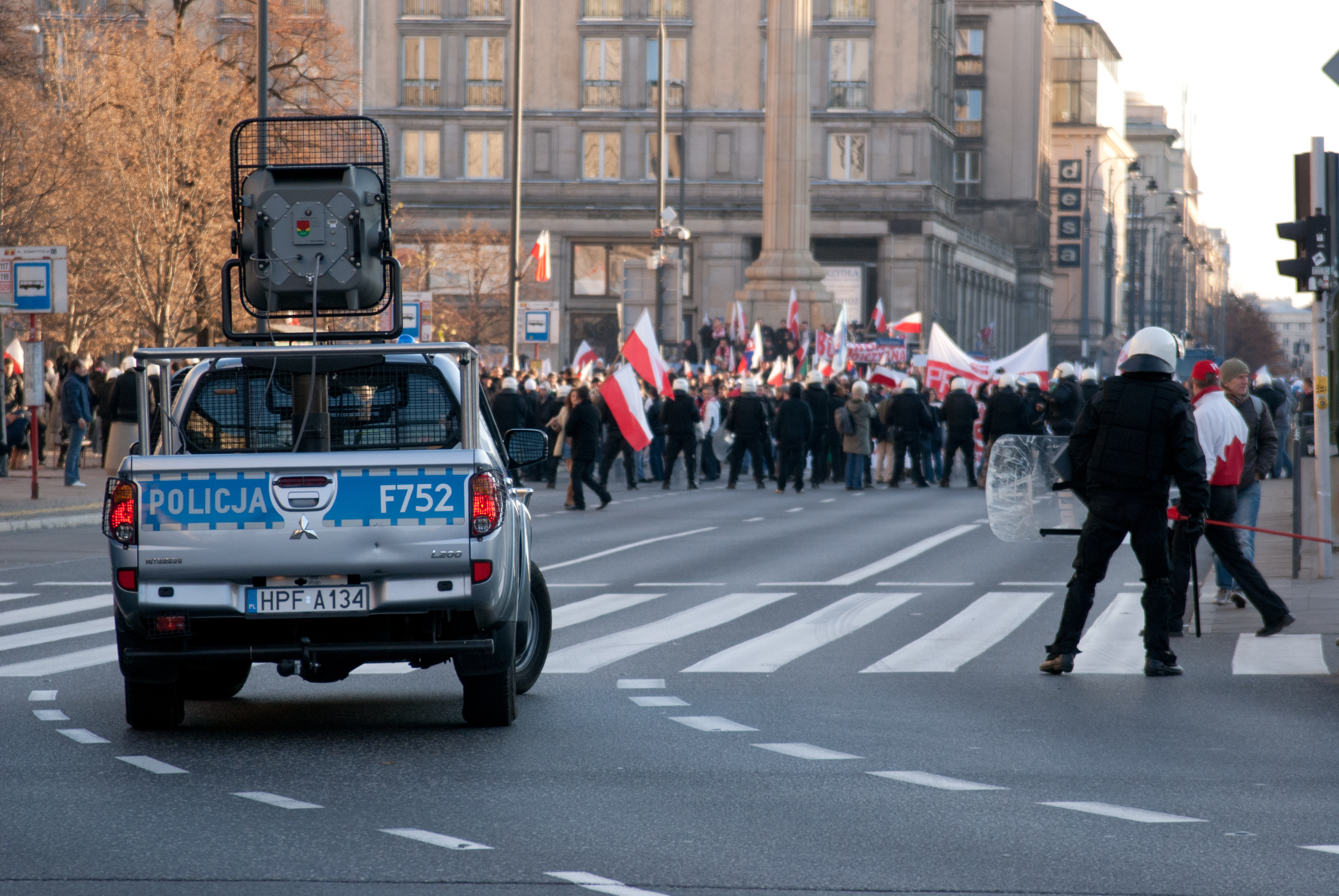
Police car equipped with an LRAD-500X sonic weapon in Warsaw, Poland in 2011

Directed energy weapons are weapons that emit energy in an aimed direction without the means of a projectile. They are non-lethal and can immobilize people as well as machines (e.g. vehicles). Directed energy weapons include electromagnetic weapons, (including laser weapons) and microwave weapons, particle beam weapons, sonic weapons and plasma weapons.

=== Ultraviolet laser ===
HSV Technologies, Inc. (named for its founders, Herr, Schlesinger and Vernon; not to be confused with Holden Special Vehicles), formerly of San Diego, California, then Port Orchard, Washington, designed a non-lethal device which was profiled in the 2002 TIME magazine article "Beyond the Rubber Bullet". It is an electrolaser using ultraviolet laser beams of 193 nm, and promises to immobilize living targets at a distance without contact. There is a plan for an engine-disabling variation for use against the electronic ignitions of cars using a 248 nm laser. The lead inventor, Eric Herr, died in 2008 and the company appears to have been dissolved, with their website defunct as of September 2017.

=== Pulsed energy projectile ===
Pulsed energy projectiles or (PEP) is a technology of non-lethal directed energy weaponry currently under development by the US military. It involves the emission of an invisible laser pulse which, upon contact with the target, ablates the surface and creates a small amount of exploding plasma. This produces a pressure wave designed to stun the target and knock them off their feet, and electromagnetic radiation that affects nerve cells causing a painful sensation.

The pulsed energy projectile is intended for riot control and is said to work over distances of up to 2 km. It weighs about 230 kg and will probably be mounted on vehicles. The weight could become lighter as laser production technology improves.

The system was developed by Mission Research Corporation (now owned by Orbital ATK). It uses a chemical deuterium fluoride laser device producing infrared laser pulses. The plasma (produced by the early part of the pulse) explodes because its electrons absorb the energy of the later part of the pulse.

In 2003, a US military review reported that the electromagnetic radiation produced by PEPs had been shown to cause pain and temporary paralysis in animal experiments.

United States Special Operations Command FY 2010 plans included starting developmental work on a counter UAV pulsed energy projectile.

=== Active denial system ===
An active denial system (ADS) is a dish that projects electromagnetic radiation just powerful enough to penetrate human skin and make the victim feel as though they are on fire, although no physical damage is done.

The ADS is a non-lethal, directed-energy weapon developed by the US military, designed for area denial, perimeter security and crowd control. Informally, the weapon has also been referred to as a "heat ray", since it works by heating the surface of targets, such as the skin of targeted human subjects.

In 2011, the ADS was redesigned to make it smaller, more reliable, and able to be used on the move. The ADS II is being designed to operate from moving aircraft, as well as moving ground vehicles. The redesign does not address problems in different environmental conditions.

Air Force Special Operations Command is experimenting with mounting an ADS on the AC-130J Ghostrider gunship to target threatening crowds or individuals on the ground. This is to give the gunship a non-lethal option so the crew has more engagement options. Due to the increasing number of engagements in populated areas, the Air Force is aiming to field a system within 10 years to have enough aircraft available with non-lethal systems. The aircraft will apparently use the ADS II version.

=== Dazzler ===
A dazzler is a directed-energy weapon intended to temporarily blind or disorient its target with intense directed radiation. Targets can include sensors or human vision. Dazzlers emit infrared or invisible light against various electronic sensors, and visible light against humans, when they are intended to cause no long-term damage to eyes. The emitters are usually lasers, making what is termed a laser dazzler. Most of the contemporary systems are man-portable, and operate in either the red (a laser diode) or green (a diode-pumped solid-state laser, DPSS) areas of the electromagnetic spectrum.

Initially developed for military use, non-military products are becoming available for use in law enforcement and security.

Weapons designed to cause permanent blindness are banned by the 1995 United Nations Protocol on Blinding Laser Weapons. The dazzler is a non-lethal weapon intended to cause temporary blindness or disorientation and therefore falls outside this protocol.

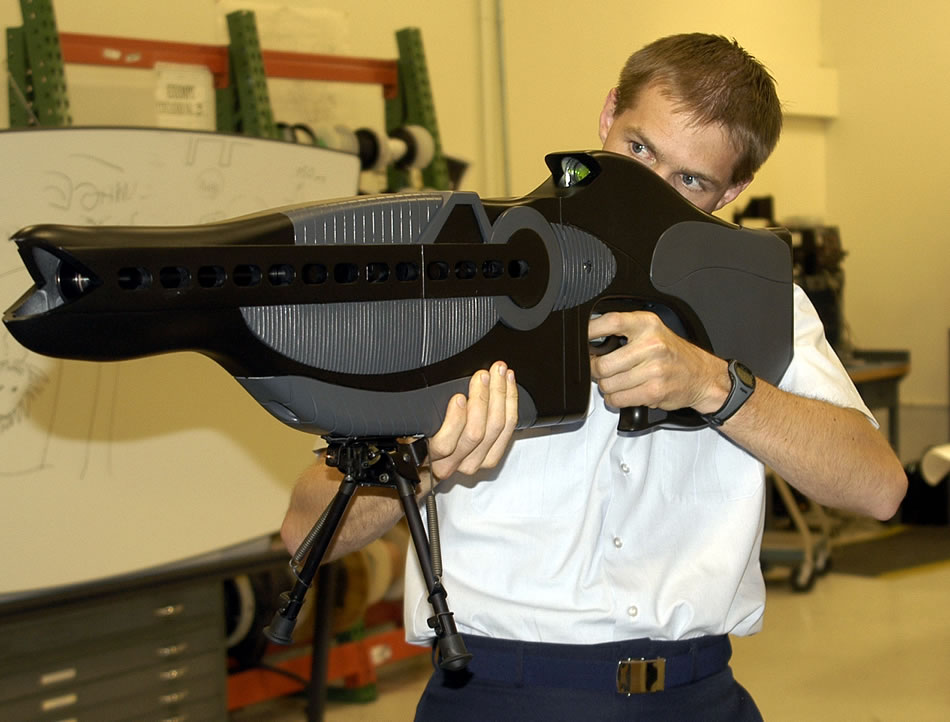
PHASR Rifle

The personnel halting and stimulation response rifle (PHASR) is a prototype non-lethal laser dazzler developed by the Air Force Research Laboratory's Directed Energy Directorate, U.S. Department of Defense. Its purpose is to temporarily disorient and blind a target. Blinding laser weapons have been tested in the past, but were banned under the 1995 UN Protocol on Blinding Laser Weapons, which the United States acceded to on 21 January 2009. The PHASR rifle, a low-intensity laser, is not prohibited under this regulation, as the blinding effect is intended to be temporary. It also uses a two-wavelength laser. The PHASR was tested at Kirtland Air Force Base, part of the Air Force Research Laboratory Directed Energy Directorate in New Mexico.

==== Blinding laser weapons ====
Several nations developed blinding laser weapons and they were allegedly used during the war in Donbas by Russia.

==== Long Range Acoustic Device ====
The Long Range Acoustic Device (LRAD) is an acoustic hailing device developed by LRAD Corporation to send messages and warning tones over longer distances or at higher volume than normal loudspeakers. LRAD systems are used for long-range communications in a variety of applications including as a means of non-lethal, non-kinetic crowd control. Though they have been called "sonic weapons", LRADs are not inherently for military use. The round black devices on top of New York City police Hummers are LRADs.

According to the manufacturer's specifications, the systems weigh from 15 to 320 pounds (6.8 to 145.1 kg) and can emit sound in a 30°- 60° beam at 2.5 kHz. The manufacturer also produces systems for public address and mass notification use that broadcast 360°.

=== Safety and legal status ===
In the United States, the University of Texas-Austin Institute for Advanced Technology (IAT) conducts basic research to advance electrodynamics and hypervelocity physics related to electromagnetic weapons.

Although generally considered "non-lethal weapons", electromagnetic weapons do pose health threats to humans. In fact, "non-lethal weapons can sometimes be deadly."

United States Department of Defense policy explicitly states that non-lethal weapons "shall not be required to have a zero probability of producing fatalities or permanent injuries." Although a Human Effects Advisory Panel was established in 1998 to provide independent assessment on human effects, data, and models for the use of 'non-lethal weapons' on the general population, the TECOM Technology Symposium in 1997 concluded on non-lethal weapons: "Determining the target effects on personnel is the greatest challenge to the testing community," primarily because "the potential of injury and death severely limits human tests." However, "directed energy weapons that target the central nervous system and cause neurophysiological disorders" may violate the Convention on Certain Conventional Weapons of 1980. And weapons that go beyond non-lethal intentions and cause "superfluous injury or unnecessary suffering" could violate the Protocol I to the Geneva Conventions of 1977." Safety and evaluation of the physical and psychological effects of the long-term or repetitive uses of the pain-inducing non-lethal weapons on humans have not been well understood or studied in any great details. Any such studies require explicit consent of all participants so as not to violate the UN Convention against torture and other cruelties.

== Misuse ==
Pepper spray is one non-lethal weapon alleged to have been misused by American police. In two incidents in California in 1997, police swabbed pepper spray directly into the eyes of protesters. Amnesty International condemned these actions, and claimed that they were likely a violation of the 1984 United Nations Convention Against Torture.

== Terrorism concerns ==
Loren Thompson, chief operating officer of the Lexington Institute in Virginia states that: "The relevant (electromagnetic weapon) technology is well within the grasp of some countries and transnational terrorist groups", and further states that U.S. hardware is susceptible to microwave and other directed-energy weapons.

Suitable materials and tools to create electromagnetic weapons are commonly available. "The threat of electromagnetic bomb proliferation is very real."

== See also ==
- Demoralization (warfare)
- Electronic warfare
- Gas pistol
- LED Incapacitator
- Net gun
- New physical principles weapons
- Pain compliance
- Peroneal strike (hand-to-hand technique)
- R.I.P. cartridge
- Stun belt
- Tranquillizer gun
