= Dazzler (weapon) =

Non-lethal temporary blindness weapon

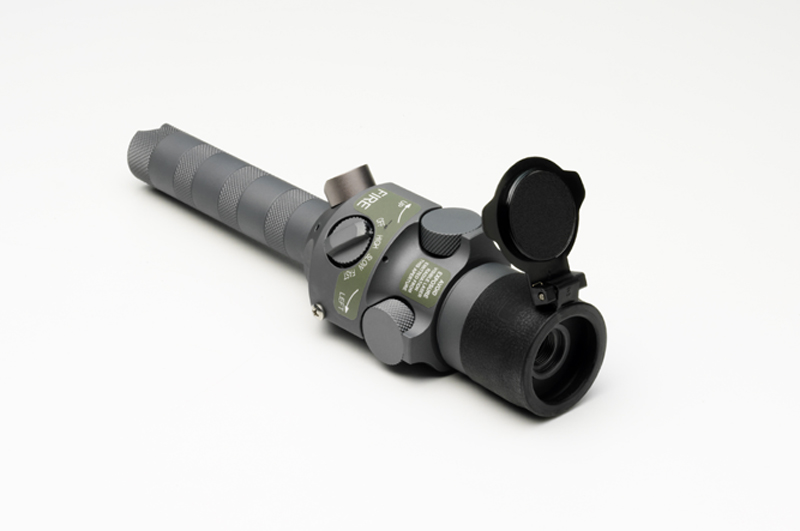
GLARE MOUT dazzler produced by B.E. Meyers & Co

A dazzler is a non-lethal weapon which uses intense directed radiation to temporarily disorient its target with flash blindness. Primarily intended to deter enemy forces from advancing in combat, it can also be used for hailing and warning. Targets can include electronic sensors as well as human vision.

Initially developed for military use, non-military products are becoming available for use in law enforcement and security.

== Design ==
Dazzlers emit infrared light against various electronic sensors and visible light against humans. They are intended not to cause long-term damage to eyes. The emitters are usually lasers, making what is termed a laser dazzler. Most of the contemporary systems can be carried by a person, and operate in either the red (a laser diode) or green (a diode-pumped solid-state laser, DPSS) areas of the electromagnetic spectrum. The green laser is chosen for its unique ability to react with the human eye. Dazzlers produce diverging light that is less coherent (focused) than typical lasers, and emit larger, less concentrated beams which are easier to aim at greater distances, causing temporary blindness without incurring permanent eye damage.

== History ==
Some searchlights are bright enough to cause permanent or temporary blindness, and they were used to dazzle the crews of bombers during World War II. Whirling Spray was a system of search lights fitted with rotating mirrors which was used to dazzle and confuse pilots attacking the Suez canal. This was developed into the Canal Defence Light, a small mobile tank mounted system intended for use in the Rhine crossings. However, the system was mainly used as conventional searchlights.

Handgun or rifle-mounted lights may also be used to temporarily blind an opponent and are sometimes marketed for that purpose. In both cases the primary purpose is to illuminate the target and their use to disorient is secondary.

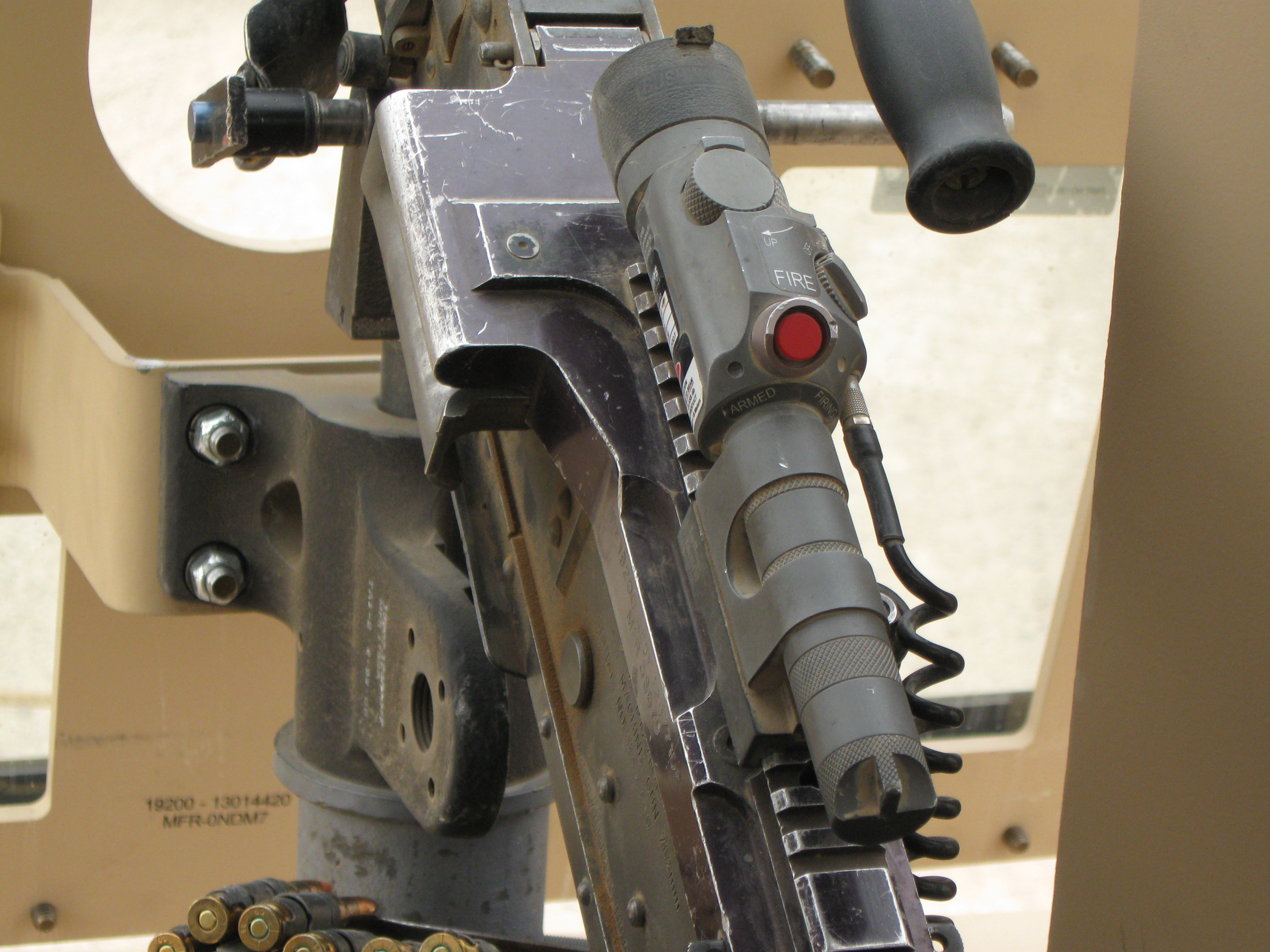
GLARE MOUT green laser dazzler mounted to an M240B during the Iraq War

The first reported use of laser dazzlers in combat was possibly by the British, during the Falklands War of 1982, when they were reputedly fitted to various Royal Navy warships to hinder low-level Argentinian air attacks. However, Michael Heseltine, the UK's Secretary of State for Defence immediately after the conflict, stated that although the dazzlers had been deployed they were not used.

At the end of Operation Desert Storm, F-15E crews observed the Iraqi military's massacre of Kurdish civilians at Chamchamal. The pilots were forbidden from firing on the Iraqi soldiers and instead used laser dazzlers against the enemy helicopter pilots. This ultimately proved ineffective in crashing any attack helicopters.

On 18 May 2006, the US military announced it was using laser dazzlers mounted on M4 rifles in troops in Iraq as a non-lethal way to stop drivers who failed to stop at checkpoints guarded by American soldiers. Other militaries have taken up use of them as well.

== Countermeasures ==
One defense against laser dazzlers are narrowband optical filters tuned to the frequency of the laser. To counter such defence, dazzlers can employ emitters using more than one wavelength, or tunable lasers with wider range of output. Another defense is photochromic materials able to become opaque under high light energy densities. Nonlinear optics techniques are being investigated: e.g. vanadium-doped zinc telluride (V:ZnTe) can be used to form electro-optic power limiters able to selectively block the intense dazzler beam without affecting weaker light from an observed scene.

== Legislation ==
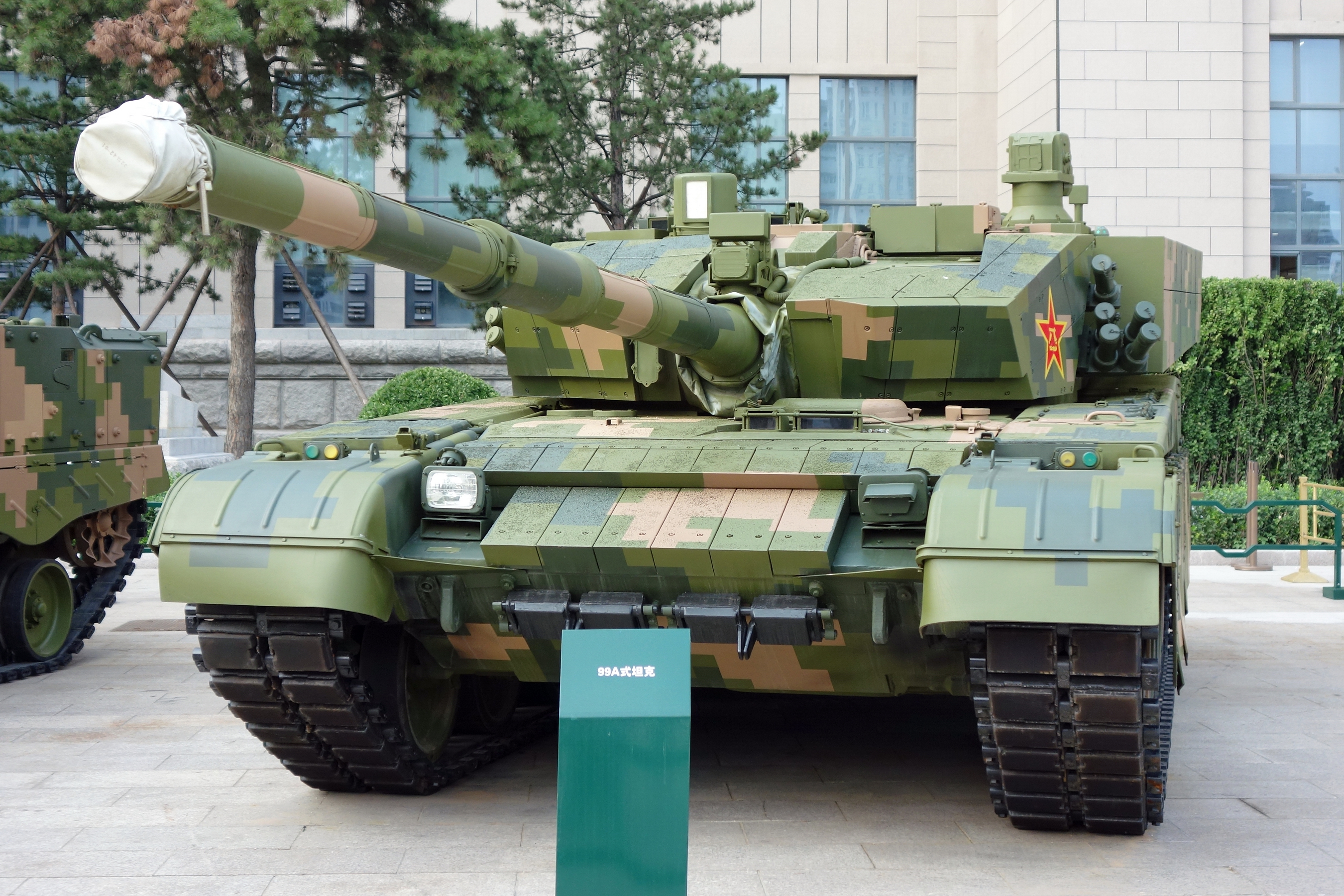
JD-3 laser dazzler on Type 99A tank. The dazzler can be seen at the top-right, located behind the gunner thermal sight.

Weapons designed to cause permanent blindness are banned by the 1995 United Nations Protocol on Blinding Laser Weapons. Dazzlers intended to cause temporary blindness or disorientation fall outside this protocol.

== Manufacturers and models ==
- LE Systems, under the sponsorship of DARPA, developed a dazzler based on a DPSS laser, with green light output at 532 nm, essentially a higher-intensity version of a green laser pointer. 532 nm light interacts with human eyes well in both daylight and reduced light conditions.
- B.E. Meyers & Co. produces several dazzlers, including the GLARE LA-9/P, GLARE MOUT, GLARE RECOIL LA-22/U, and GLARE HELIOS. The GLARE RECOIL and GLARE HELIOS dazzlers use built-in safety mechanisms to prevent eye damage by pairing the dazzler with a rangefinder; the dazzler will self-modulate power output with respect to range to target so the closer the target, the lower the output and the farther the target, the greater the output. As a result the maximum safe laser intensity output is used without risking ocular damage. The older GLARE LA-9/P variant includes a rangefinder and an automatic cutoff failsafe but does not have automated modulation capability. Effective range for the various GLARE dazzlers ranges from 400 m to 20+ km. Despite having the greatest effective range of 5 to 25+ km, the GLARE HELIOS is classified as an FDA Laser safety#Class 1M eye-safe laser.
- The Dazer Laser Guardian, Dazer Laser Stealth, and "Dazer Laser Defender" by Laser Energetics, Inc. are different types of optical distraction laser systems which can temporarily visually impair, illuminate, target designate, warn and communicate visually with the intended target.
- The Saber 203 dazzler is a grenade launcher based system. It is similar to the LANL-developed optical munition, Project Perseus. The dazzler is launched from a standard 40 mm grenade launcher and activated via a control switch to induce glare. The US Marine Corps brought Saber 203 dazzlers to Somalia in January 1995 during Operation United Shield, but senior US Department of Defense officials reportedly halted its experimental use at the last minute for "humane reasons". According to the Air Force, the Saber 203 system is also usable for law enforcement purposes.
- The JD-3 laser dazzler is mounted on the Chinese Type 98 main battle tank. It is coupled with a laser radiation detector, and serves as a countermeasure by automatically aiming at any enemy's illuminating laser designator, attempting to overwhelm its optical systems or blind the operator.
- The ZM-87 Portable Laser Disturber is a Chinese electro-optic countermeasure laser device. It can blind enemy troops at up to 2 to 3 km (1 to 2 mi) range and temporarily blind them at up to 10 km (6 mi) range. This weapon is banned by the 1995 United Nations Protocol on Blinding Laser Weapons.
- The Photonic Disruptor, classified as a threat assessment laser (TALI), was developed and manufactured by Wicked Lasers in cooperation with Xtreme Alternative Defense Systems. This tactical laser is equipped with a versatile focus-adjustable collimating lens to compensate for range and power intensity when used at close range to incapacitate an attacker, at a distance to safely identify threats. The Photonic Disruptor has been featured on Discovery Channel's "Future Weapons." It was also reportedly used by Sea Shepherd Conservation Society during their operations with the Ady Gil in the Southern Ocean against Japanese whaling.
- The Outfit DEC or Laser Dazzle Sight (LDS) is a British ship-based laser. The veiling-glare laser uses ultraviolet light and is designed to dazzle by causing fluorescence in the lens of the human eye. There are other such laser weapon systems in development.

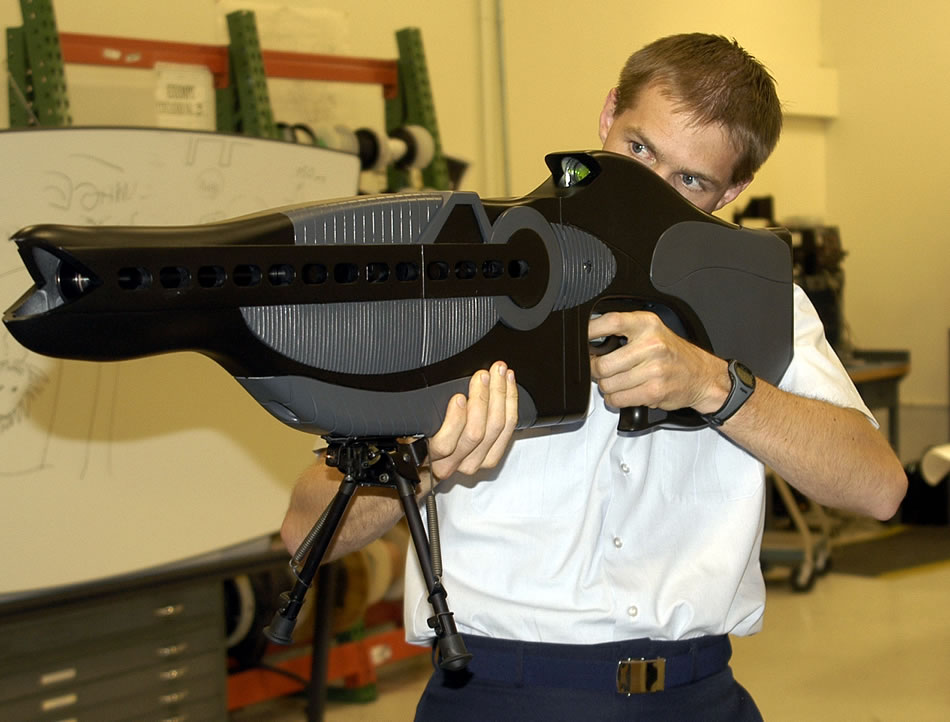
PHaSR, a United States dazzler-style weapon

- StunRay is a less-lethal optical incapacitation effector developed by Genesis Illumination Inc. It uses collimated incoherent (non-laser) broad spectrum visible and near infrared light from a short-arc lamp to safely and temporarily impair vision, disorient and incapacitate aggressors for 5 seconds to 3 minutes without causing physical harm. Full recovery generally occurs in 10 to 20 minutes. The hand-held model is designed for a range of 10 to 100 m (30 to 300 ft). StunRay can be scaled up for ranges from 100 to 1,000 m (300 to 3,000 ft) for vehicle mounting, checkpoints, secure facilities, patrol boats, and ship protection.
- The PHaSR or Personnel halting and stimulation response rifle was developed by the US Department of Defense.
- Three US Patents are held by Science & Engineering Associates (SEA) who is now QinetiQ North America. They are: 5,685,636 Eye Safe Laser Security Device; 6,007,218 Self-Contained Laser Illuminator Module; and 6,190,022 B1 Enhanced Non-Lethal Security Device.

== See also ==
- Flashbang
- Flashlight
- Terra-3
- List of laser articles
- Laser designator
- AN/PEQ-1 SOFLAM
