= ACR =

ACR may refer to:

== Science and technology ==
=== Medicine ===
- Albumin/creatinine ratio, in urine
- ACR gene, encoding the enzyme acrosin
- ACR score, for rheumatoid arthritis
- American College of Radiology
- American College of Rheumatology

=== Other uses in science and technology ===
- Absolute Category Rating, a test method used in quality tests
- Accessibility Conformance Report, a filled Voluntary Product Accessibility Template
- Adobe Camera Raw, a raw image file converter
- Advanced CANDU reactor, a nuclear reactor
- Advanced Communications Riser, a technical specification for PC motherboard expansion slots
- Advanced contrast ratio, of a display system
- Air conditioning/refrigeration copper tubing
- Anomalous cosmic ray, energetic ions of interstellar origin
- Anonymous call rejection, a telephone calling feature
- Antarctic Cold Reversal, a climatic event about 14,500 years ago
- Anti Cam-out Ribs of a Phillips II screw drive
- Attenuation-to-crosstalk ratio of communication links
- Automatic circuit recloser, in electric power distribution
- Automatic content recognition of a media file

== Military and weapons ==
- AČR (Armáda České republiky), the Czech Armed Forces
- Adaptive Combat Rifle, a modular assault rifle by Magpul
- Advanced Combat Rifle, a US Army program
  - Steyr ACR, Austrian company Steyr's entry into the program
  - AAI ACR, US company AAI Corporation's entry into the program
  - Colt ACR, US Company Colt's entry into the program
- Armored cavalry regiment, of the US Army
- Armored cruiser, a US Navy cruiser designation

== Transportation ==
=== Rail ===
- Acumulador de Carga Rápida, a Spanish battery electric tram system
- Accrington railway station, England, station code ACR
- Alberta Central Railway, an historical railroad in Alberta, Canada
- Algoma Central Railway, in Northern Ontario, Canada
- Anglesey Central Railway, in Wales, UK

=== Air and vehicles ===
- Araracuara Airport, Colombia, IATA airport code ACR
- Aircraft Classification Rating
- American Club Racer, a version of the Dodge Viper car

== Other uses ==
- ACR Electronics or ACR Group, American manufacturer of communications equipment
- ACR Poker, online poker site
- A Certain Ratio, a British post-punk band
- Accelerated chart ratio, used in the UK singles chart for music
- Achi language, a Mayan language of Guatemala, ISO 939-3 language code acr
- Acronym, where acr. is its abbreviation
