= Armtech C30R =

- Type: Bullpup assault rifle
- Place of origin: Australia

Production history
- Designed: 1986
- Manufacturer: Armtech Ltd

Specifications
- Mass: 3.17 kg
- Length: 719 mm
- Barrel length: 457 mm
- Cartridge: 5.56×45mm NATO (Quadrant with 3.56g standard M193 bullet, dimensions of the rectangular ammunition 35.7×15.8×9.5 mm)
- Caliber: 5.56mm
- Action: Rotary breech
- Rate of fire: 750 rpm
- Muzzle velocity: 795 m/s
- Feed system: 60-round internal magazine
- Sights: Iron sights

The Armtech C30R was an assault rifle concept using 5.56mm (Quadrant with 3.56g standard M193 bullet, dimensions of the rectangular ammunition 35.7×15.8×9.5 mm) similar to the H&K G11.

== See also ==
- Heckler & Koch G11 – (Germany)
- Gyrojet – (United States)
- Steyr ACR – (Austria)
- Benelli CB M2 – (Italy)
- Voere VEC-91 – (Austria)
- Lightweight Small Arms Technologies
- List of bullpup firearms
- List of assault rifles
