= AAI ACR =

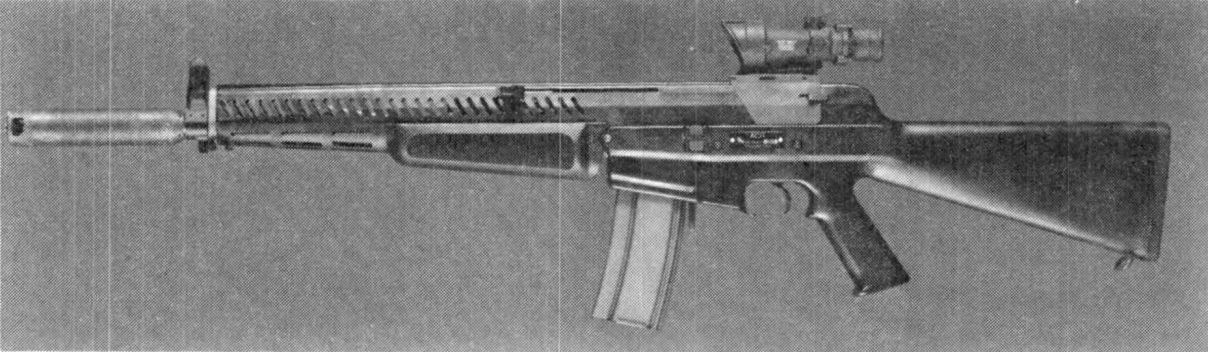
- Type: Assault rifle/Flechette rifle
- Place of origin: United States

Service history
- Used by: United States (experimental)

Production history
- Manufacturer: AAI Corporation

Specifications
- Mass: 3.53 kg (7.8 lb) (empty)
- Length: 1,016 mm (40.0 in)
- Barrel length: 21.3 in (540 mm)
- Cartridge: 5.56×45mm sub-calibre flechette
- Caliber: 5.56mm (Sabot Diameter)
- Action: Gas-operated
- Rate of fire: Semi automatic 3-round burst at 1800 rounds per minute
- Muzzle velocity: 1,402 m/s (4,600 ft/s)
- Feed system: 30-round detachable box magazine
- Sights: single power telescope, interchangeable iron sight

The AAI ACR was a prototype flechette-firing assault rifle built for the US Army's Advanced Combat Rifle program of 1989/90. Although the AAI design proved effective, as did most of the weapons submitted, the entire ACR program ended with none of the entrants achieving performance 100% better than the M16A2, the baseline for a successful ACR weapon.

== Design ==
Based on AAI's SFR/XM19 rifle developed as part of the SPIW program, the AAI ACR was externally one of the more conventional entrants to the ACR program. A closed bolt, gas operated, full stocked, magazine fed, conventionally laid out rifle.

The 1990 ACR Program Summary report describes the operation system as:

"...incorporate an 'entrapped gas' operating system. Gun gases enter a cylinder, drive a piston to power the system, and prevent any leakage of propellant gases and residues into the other mechanism parts."

Other contemporary sources describe it as innovative, but how it differs from traditional Long or Short stroke piston systems already in existence at the time is unclear. Jane's Infantry Weapons hypothesizes that it replicates the system from the previous Serial Bullet Rifle/Serial Flechette Rifle in which 3 chambers were cycled in and out of alignment with the barrel to give a rapid 3 round burst. They base this on the design being well regarded at the time but being held back by problems with the contemporary flechette cartridge that later development solved for the ACR.

Semi-automatic and three-round burst are selected with a two-position selector. The safety catch is in front of the trigger guard and when activated physically blocks insertion of a finger into the trigger-guard. The rifle features a quick change lever for swapping optics, and was provided with a recommended 4× optical sight with a tritium-powered graticule. Iron sights were also available and the mounting did accept other optics.

As with the Steyr ACR, the sabots left the barrel at high speed, this was noted as presenting a potential danger to other soldiers, as well as to the shooter if they bounced off the ground when firing prone. Additionally as the cartridge used the existing 5.56×45 mm case, traditional 5.56 rounds could be chambered by the rifle. Due to the light weight of the projectile, the gas port tapped gas earlier in the barrel than conventional weapons. Therefore, if traditional cartridges were used the increased pressure could cause serious malfunction or injury to the user. To prevent this, the magazine was designed to prevent the loading of non-flechette cartridges and the magazine well altered to not fit an M16 magazine. However, rounds could still be chambered by hand.

== Ammunition ==
The AAI ACR's rounds consist of a saboted flechette packaged in the conventional brass case of a 5.56×45mm round. The fin-stabilized flechette itself weighs 0.66 g, or approx. 0,023 ounce and is approximately 1.6 mm in diameter and 41.27 mm long, or 0,06 inches by 1,62 inches, with a roughened surface to ensure the sabot and flechette stay together during shot travel. The sabot is a four-part spindle sabot made of liquid crystal polymer held together with a rubber O-ring at the rear of the sabot. The choice of material solved AAI's issues with previous flechette rifles such as those developed during the SPIW program. Namely, previous plastics failed or generated dust considered a health hazard, and previous cartridge required the use Primer actuation. The weight of the flechette and sabot assembly is 1.36g or approx. 0,048 ounce, providing a low recoil impulse. Firing generated a chamber pressure of 55000 psi

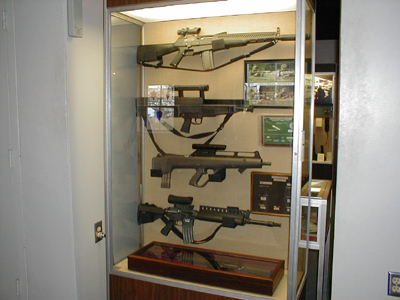
Rifles tested in ACR program, AAI ACR top most

== See also ==
- Colt ACR
- Steyr ACR
- HK ACR
- Special Purpose Individual Weapon
