= Firebase Illingworth =

Site information
- Type: Army

Location
- Coordinates: 11.569°N 105.944°E

Site history
- Built: 1970
- In use: 1970
- Battles/wars: Vietnam War; Cambodian Incursion

Garrison information
- Occupants: 8th Cavalry Regiment

Firebase Illingworth is a former U.S. Army firebase northwest of Tây Ninh in southwest Vietnam.

== History ==
This firebase was named for US Army Corporal John James Illingworth, a member of Alpha Company, 2nd Battalion, 8th Cavalry Regiment, posthumous recipient of the Silver Star.

The firebase was first established on 17 March 1970 by the 2nd Battalion, 8th Cavalry Regiment, 35 km northwest of Tây Ninh and approximately 5 km from the Cambodian border.

Twenty bunkers built into a 4 feet (1.2 m) high earthen berm formed the post's defenses, with Claymore mines placed outside the fortifications. The 2nd Battalion's commander, Lieutenant colonel Michael J. Conrad, had chosen not to surround the post with concertina wire in the belief that wire posed little obstacle to the enemy. Manning the defenses were the reconnaissance platoon and Company C from the 2nd Battalion, 8th Cavalry, along with four M113 armored personnel carriers and an M551 Sheridan armored vehicle from Troop A, 1st Squadron, 11th Armored Cavalry Regiment. Also present were a M45 Quadmount machine gun from B Battery, 5th Battalion, 2nd Artillery, a mortar platoon, two eight-inch howitzers from A Battery, 2nd Battalion, 32nd Artillery, three 155-mm. howitzers from A Battery, 1st Battalion, 30th Artillery and six 105-mm. howitzers from B Battery, 1st Battalion, 77th Artillery.

At approximately 02:00 on 1 April the People's Army of Vietnam (PAVN) 1st Battalion, 272nd Regiment hit the base with over 300 rounds of mortar and recoilless rifle fire and then assaulted the base with a force of over 400 troops. The ground assault targeted the northern end of the base, a sector manned by the reconnaissance platoon. Dust from the bombardment allowed the PAVN to get close without being seen and fouled weapons quickly. Most of the reconnaissance platoon soldiers were forced to resort to throwing hand grenades when their M16 rifles jammed after firing just a handful of magazines. Within minutes of launching the assault the first attackers were at the berm. SP4 Peter C. Lemon was helping to man a machine gun. After both it and his M16 rifle jammed, Lemon began hurling grenades until they ran out. Suddenly a PAVN soldier appeared in the dust cloud, and Lemon clubbed him with his rifle. He then jumped over the berm and attacked two surprised PAVN soldiers with his bare hands, killing them both. An exploding satchel charge peppered Lemon with shrapnel, but he managed to make it back over the berm. Armed with a new weapon, he continued fighting until additional wounds caused him to collapse.

At the center of the defense were the mortars and artillery. The PAVN knew exactly where they were, and within minutes one of the base's three mortar positions was in flames, apparently from a satchel charge thrown by a sapper. The second mortar position fell soon thereafter. The third mortar position lasted somewhat longer, but the PAVN silenced it as well. The howitzers were also a priority target. One took a direct hit from an enemy round, starting yet another ammunition fire. The press of the attack compelled the reconnaissance platoon to retreat to a secondary position. With the help of 8-inch guns firing flechette rounds from Firebase Hannas 4 km to the south, as well as an orbiting AC–119 gunship, the platoon stabilized the situation. Just after 03:00 the reconnaissance platoon commander ordered a counterattack that recaptured the berm.

A sapper threw a charge near the ammunition supply in the howitzer position at the center of the base, and within minutes, fires threatened the entire area. At 03:18 the ammunition exploded, tearing through a section of berm and spraying the area with shrapnel. The blast stunned both the infantrymen on the berm and the artillerymen, and for a moment the Americans stopped firing. While the guns were silent, men from Company C moved forward and filled the gap along the northern perimeter. With that, the battle ended. Illingworth would take fire for the next forty-five minutes, but the PAVN did not return. At daybreak helicopters arrived to evacuate the American casualties - 24 dead and 54 wounded. Patrols located 74 dead PAVN. Lemon would be awarded the Medal of Honor for his actions during the battle.

== Current use ==
The base has reverted to farmland.
