= Needlegun =

Firearm that fires small metal darts

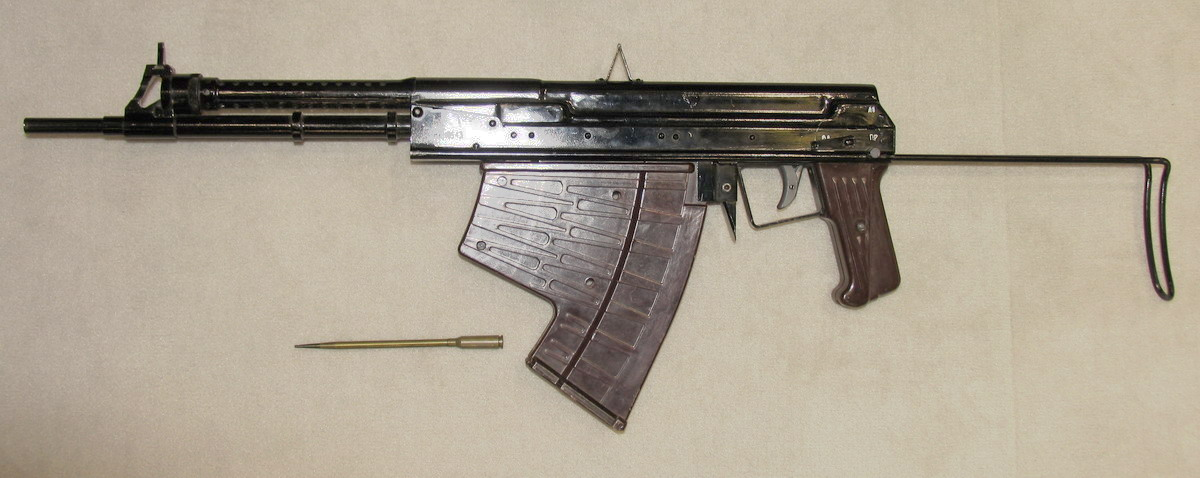
The APS underwater rifle, an underwater firearm designed by the Soviet Union in the early 1970s

A needlegun, also known as a needler, flechette gun or fletcher, is a firearm that fires small, sometimes fin-stabilized, metal darts or flechettes. Theoretically, the advantages of a needlegun over conventional projectile firearms are in its compact size, high rate of fire, and extreme muzzle velocity. The needle presents less frontal area than a bullet, producing less drag and thus more effective range (especially in water) than a wider projectile of the same mass and velocity. There have been experiments to make guided flechettes that can home in on targets.

== Pre-industrial ==
The first projectiles in early gun systems dating from the 14th century were typically hand wrought iron flechettes wrapped in a leather sabot. However, due to the expense and trouble of making these darts in a pre-industrial society, they were soon replaced with the less accurate stone cannonball.

== World War I ==
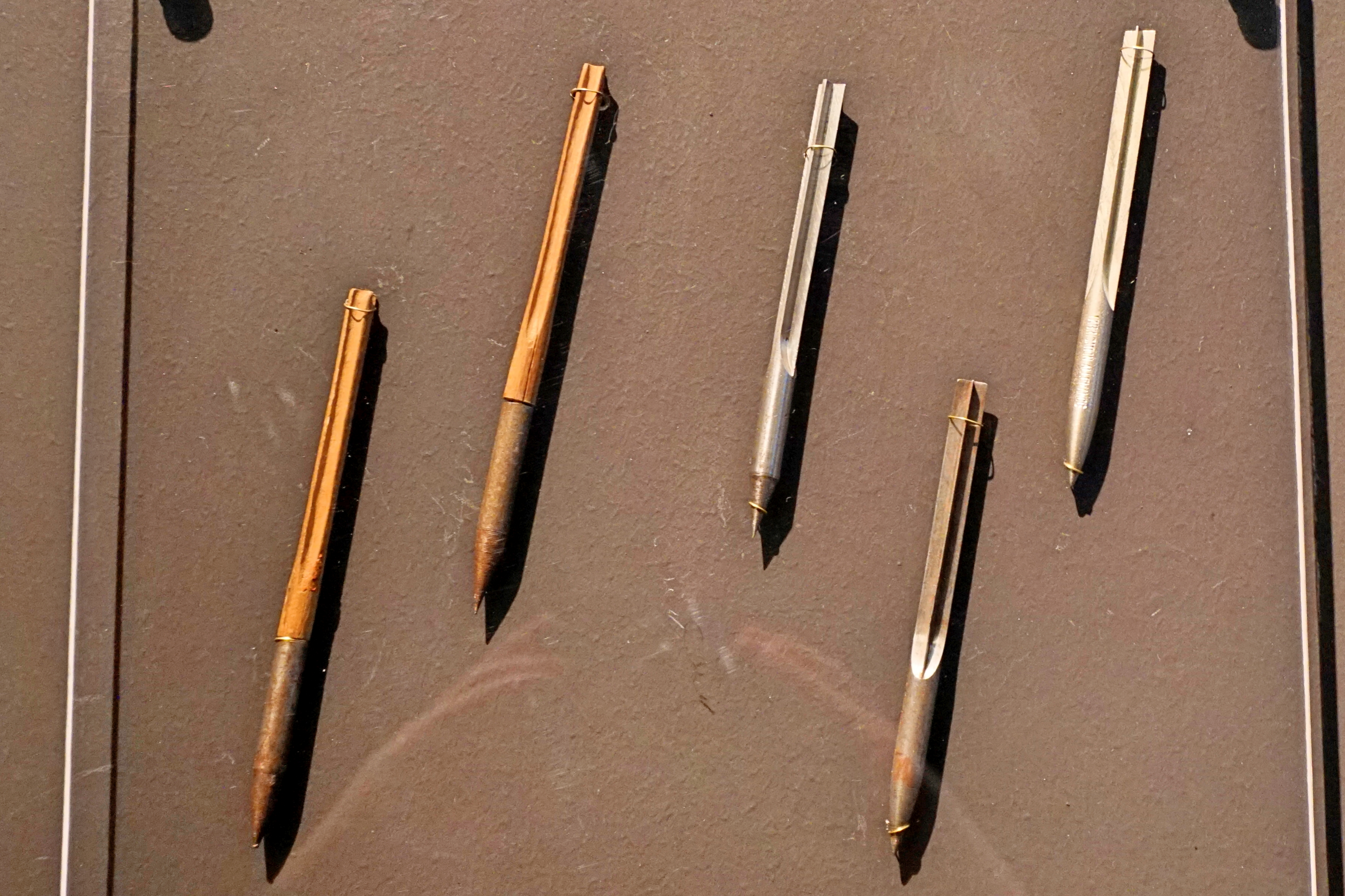
World War I flechettes

Flechettes again came into mass use in the years before World War I. Starting as early as 1910, the French began experimenting with air-dropped flechettes; flechettes dropped from planes were used extensively during the war.

== Vietnam War ==
A June 1978 issue of Gallery Magazine quotes L. Fletcher Prouty observing a test of flechette weapons in 1960 and the testimony of William E. Colby in the Church Committee on September 16 to 18, 1975 describing flechette weapons. Charles A. Senseney testified that he was a project engineer of the M-1 dart launcher that was described as resembling a M1911 pistol with a sight mount at the top.

Senseney claimed the M-1 was designed for the US Army Special Forces to be used in the Vietnam War but never got there due to not being able to get into the US Army's logistics system in time. Flechette ammunition encased in a sabot was available for the M-16, shotguns, and other weapons for use in Vietnam.

== Underwater ==
A June 1965 Esquire magazine story on the making of the then-upcoming James Bond film Thunderball featured drawings of dart firing pistols that were not used in the completed film.

At the same time several makes of underwater firearms fired a steel bolt just over 4 inches long (but without fins).

== Special Purpose Individual Weapon ==
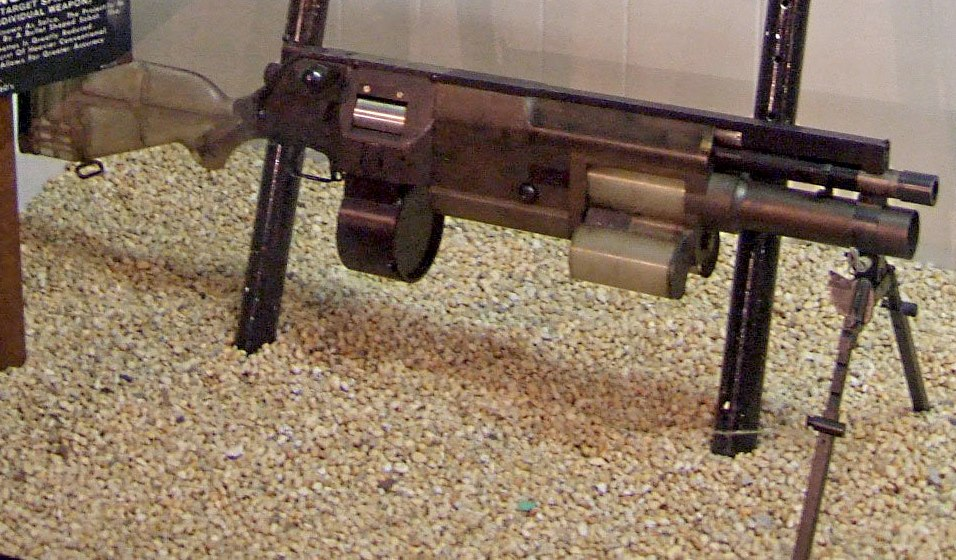
5.56mm Point Target SPIW (Special Purpose Individual Weapon) at the National Firearms Museum.

The Special Purpose Individual Weapon was a long-running United States Army program to develop, in part, a workable flechette-based "rifle", though other concepts were also involved. The concepts continued to be tested under the Future Rifle Program and again in the 1980s and 1990s under the Advanced Combat Rifle program, but neither program resulted in a system useful enough to warrant replacing the current M16.

== In popular culture ==
In Marko Kloos's Frontlines series of novels, the military commonly use M66 flechette rifles and pistols putting out thousands of rounds a minute.

In William Gibson's novel Neuromancer, the character Molly Millions uses a flechette pistol.

In Neal Stephenson's novel Snow Crash, characters use a modified version of a needle/railgun called Reason.

In Michael Moorcock's Jerry Cornelius stories, the title character uses a transistorized needlegun.

In Terry Brooks's Genesis of Shannara stories, multiple characters use flechette guns.

In TSR's 1982 science fiction role-playing game Star Frontiers, a "needler" was a common weapon with multiple variations existing in the game.

In Bungie's 1996 video game sequel, Marathon Infinity, the KKV-7 10mm SMG Flechette makes its debut and introduces the player to an extreme rate of fire.

In the Halo video games, originally developed by Bungie, the Needler is an alien weapon that fires homing crystalline needles that explode after a delay. In 2010, the Needle Rifle was introduced to the series with the release of Halo: The Fall of Reach.

In Call of Duty: Black Ops 4, a flechette rifle called the S6 Stingray can be unlocked. It is a two-round burst tactical rifle firing high damage serrated projectiles. Impact blasting projectiles can be equipped for maximum damage.

In Fallout 2 there is a pistol variant of flechette firing weapons known as the "Needler Pistol".

In the videogame F.E.A.R., there are several 10mm flechette nailguns.

In Cruelty Squad, there are flechette firing shotguns, an assault rifle, and a PDW.

In the fictional universe of Warhammer 40,000, Needleguns are occasionally mentioned as being used by non-military combatants, such as inquisitors and assassins but they are sometimes used by imperial guard members or chaos cultists as shown in the founding a gaunt’s ghost omnibus.

In Frank Herbert's Dune novel, many organizations and houses wielded flechette projectile weapons, and a needlegun is featured in the 1984 film adaptation as a pistol wielded by Gurney Halleck.

In Robert A Heinlein's novel The Number of the Beast, the character Deety (Deja Thoris Burroughs-Carter) owns an illegal flechette pistol for self-defence.

In David Weber's Honorverse, several factions use flechette guns.

In K. A. Applegate's Animorphs, the alien race of Howlers use flechette guns.

In Dan Simmons' Hyperion Cantos, flechette guns are used by many military and police forces.

In the Altered Carbon TV show, Takeshi Kovacs uses Ingrum 40 Flechette Gun for a period, a high tech needlegun pistol that magnetically pulls fired flechettes back into the bottom of the gun and automatically reloads them into the magazine.

In Bob Shaw's Night Walk, the protagonist, Sam Tallon, is blinded by being fired upon at point-blank range by hornet guns, which may be similar to needleguns, although they are also drugged, probably to increase incapacitation or pain.

In Infinite Ryvius, a needle-shooting handgun is used by multiple antagonists, influencing the plot.

In the original Star Wars: Battlefront II game, a flechette shotgun is offered as an upgraded weapon to engineers who are able to kill eight enemies with a shotgun on a single life.

"Needle Gun", a song by Hawkwind from their 1985 album The Chronicle of the Black Sword

== See also ==
- Nail gun
- SCMITR
- Steyr ACR
- 6.5×25mm CBJ
