= Floating breech =

A floating breech is a breechblock of a firearm that is not held rigidly to the barrel at the moment of firing, but instead is free to move in the opposite direction to the projectile. This can help to reduce the recoil induced in the body of the firearm so long as the subsequent motion of the breechblock is retarded in some manner - either by a spring, or by back-pressure against a piston attached to the breechblock provided by tapping the expelled propellant gases. The motion of the breech and/or the expansion of the expelled gases can also be used to power a case-ejection mechanism and/or reloading mechanism.

If the breechblock and barrel are locked for firing but the barrel is not fixed to the body, it is described as a floating action.

If the ammunition is caseless, the time required to expel the previous case is removed from the cycle time of an automatic firearm and a higher rate of fire can be obtained than with normal ammunition.

The Heckler & Koch G11 Assault rifle uses caseless ammunition, but has a rotating breech, not a floating breech. However, the barrel, breech and magazine as a whole 'float' within the housing of the weapon. Note that the breechblock in this firearm rotates about an axis perpendicular to the main axis of the barrel, whereas most other rotating breechblocks rotate about the same axis as the long axis of the barrel.

== See also ==
- Floating chamber blowback
