= General Conrad =

General Conrad may refer to:

- Casper H. Conrad Jr. (1872–1954), U.S. Army brigadier general
- Gerhard Conrad (pilot) (1895–1982), German Luftwaffe lieutenant general
- Michael J. Conrad (born 1933), U.S. Army major general

== See also ==
- Franz Conrad von Hötzendorf (1852−1925), Austro-Hungarian Army general
- Rudolf Konrad (1891–1964), German Wehrmacht general
