= Lightweight Small Arms Technologies =

U.S. weapon program

The Lightweight Small Arms Technologies (LSAT) program is funded by the U.S. Joint Service Small Arms Program, with the goal of significantly reducing the weight of small arms and their ammunition. Following a series of military programs to investigate advances in small arms (SPIW, Future Rifle, ACR, OICW), the LSAT program is the US military's latest project to replace existing US small arms. Tactical concepts and the research from the previous small arms programs indicates that lightening small arms is the first significant step towards increasing soldiers' lethality and survivability.

Initiated in 2004 (then called the Lightweight Machine Gun and Ammunition program), development is now led by Textron. Development began with two types of weight reducing ammunition, and a light machine gun to serve as a testbed and technology demonstrator. Minimization of program risk is shown by the development of the lower performing but less risky polymer-cased ammunition alongside caseless ammunition (which falls higher in both criteria), by the use of extensive computer simulations before prototyping, and by the use of existing and proven technologies, such as the High Ignition Temperature Propellant (HITP) developed for the Heckler & Koch G11.

In 2008, the program had achieved working prototypes for the polymer-cased ammunition and the LMG, which were tested by the Army in 2012. The less orthodox caseless ammunition, and a rifle firing both types of ammunition, have also been developed. The designers aim to provide further projectile improvements, including greener bullets and a more lethal caliber, as well as the use of electronics, such as rounds counters, and lasers for sighting, target acquisition, and steering.

After further research and development into both ammunition types and the weapons that fire them, one of the two shall be chosen for production. In August 2013, AAI Corporation (now Textron) was awarded a contract to continue development of both cased telescoped and caseless ammunition.

== Background ==
The Lightweight Small Arms Technologies program is the culmination of much research and information obtained by the US Army. It succeeds several other programs to develop new small arms technologies, each program of which produced results that were infeasible or insignificant. The first three (the Special Purpose Individual Weapon, the Future Rifle Program, and the Advanced Combat Rifle program) demonstrated the ballistic problems of flechette ammunition, and the ACR program also showed the inability of kinetic-energy firearms to significantly compensate for human inaccuracy (the small accuracy increase of all of the concepts tested was out-weighed by the trade-offs required). The subsequent identification of programmable air-bursting munitions as the only way to significantly increase accuracy was followed by the fourth, and most recent, cancelled program—the OICW program. The ability to detonate an explosive in the air at range provided a huge increase in accuracy, but the resultant XM29 proved too heavy to use. The separation of the XM29 into the XM25 and the XM8 provided no long-term solution to the weight problem, and the program was suspended indefinitely. Developments in lighter weapons (such as LSAT) could see a return to the concept, although the military has not recently expressed a desire for a return. The indefinite suspension of the program sounded the death of short-term advances in infantry weapon lethality, and indicated the shift to other projects.

After the failure to significantly improve firearms of the near future, the U.S. military is using the development of other infantry equipment to improve the effectiveness of the soldier. Most notable is the development of electronics and information technology to advance soldiers' awareness and communications (as with the Land Warrior program). However, this new equipment increases the weight burden on the soldier, who then has to strike a compromise between the extra equipment and mobility. Reducing the weight of infantry equipment allows for more mobile, better equipped troops. Since a soldier's weapon and ammunition are a large portion of his total burden (and available technologies exist to sharply lighten them), reducing the weight of the two is crucial to increasing the amount of advanced technology a soldier can carry. Computer technologies integrated into the weapon and its sights make a light weapon crucial, otherwise the soldier will have difficulty carrying the weapon and its heavy sights. Other indirect improvements in soldier effectiveness include new strategies and the development of air transport. This is aimed towards creating fast, well-equipped soldiers able to be quickly deployed to counter threats. The logistics and mobility problems of heavy equipment hinder this possibility.

The LSAT program allows a vast reduction in soldiers' carrying loads, thereby allowing new and more equipment, reducing logistical strain, and increasing mobility. The combined benefits to soldier effectiveness are big enough to warrant the investment in the new lightweight technologies.

=== Technologies ===
The existence of weight-reducing technologies made the LSAT program feasible, and many of these technologies can be seen in the program's products. The lightest existing ammunition to fire standard bullets comprised caseless varieties. The Heckler & Koch G11 was the only weapon to achieve a service capable assault rifle firing caseless ammunition. Its unique ammunition, designed by Dynamit Nobel, introduced several important innovations, such as improved internal ballistics through the use of a primer, and the prevention of cooking off (the lack of a case makes it easier for a hot chamber to ignite the exposed propellant) through the use of the less sensitive hexogen/octogen as the explosive component. The Advanced Combat Rifle experimental program gave the US Army access to the ammunition and entrenched the ammunition as a viable option. With the high efficiency and lethality of the ammunition, the vast expenditure such a concept had needed for development, and the reduced risk of using an already proven ammunition design, the LSAT program chose a licensed version of Dynamit Nobel's caseless ammunition as a route towards its goal of weight reduction. The LSAT program also uses the same concept of a rotating chamber as the G11 (albeit, the LSAT LMG chamber swings around a longitudinal pivot. whereas the G11 chamber rotated around a horizontal axis at its very centre).

Polymer casing for ammunition had already been developed and produced, and it provided the second route for achieving weight reduction. While a polymer case could never be quite as light as no case, the risks involved in the use of polymer ammunition were less, due to its similarity to present ammunition and the reduced heat load on both the weapon and the ammunition's propellant.

Further budding technologies, such as alternative barrel materials (such as ceramics), and the increased efficiency and size reduction of telescoped ammunition (used by the G11 and other developmental weapons), also formed the basis for the LSAT program.

== Program ==
In 2004, the Joint Service Small Arms Program created the Lightweight Machine Gun and Ammunition program to compare conceptual, lightweight machine guns and ammunition designs by two teams of companies. The team of eight, led by AAI Corporation had their design chosen over the design of the General Dynamics-led team. In 2005, the project was replaced with the Lightweight Small Arms Technologies program to place the emphasis on developing technologies for a wide range of small arms. The earlier Lightweight Family of Weapons and Ammunition concept is visible in the new program. The cohesive team of companies is combined with government support to ensure success.

In accordance with the program's name, the focus is on creating lightweight technologies for all small arms, and the Light Machine Gun it has started with is an entry point for a family of lightweight small arms and ammunition. Beginning with an LMG is unusual for an effort to develop a new family of weapons, although the increased engineering difficulty of a machine gun over a rifle is balanced against decreased attention and antagonistic scrutiny. The program minimized development risk: it used G11 technology that had been on the verge of deployment; and the parallel development of the composite-cased and caseless ammunition meant that, if the caseless ammunition effort succeeded, much of the development work gained with the composite cased weapon could be applied to it, and, if it failed, the composite-cased version was likely to succeed on its own. This parallel development involves using what is essentially the same weapon for both types of ammunition, with the same action (having only marginal differences, such as added chamber sealing technologies required for the caseless firing version) and the same weight-lowering technologies. The program uses extensive computer simulation and modelling, particularly of the weapon action. This reduces both time and expenditure for prototyping and testing. The program also uses a 'spiral development' approach, whereby the weapon and ammunition is rolled out in stages or 'spirals', each stage producing a new version that is an improvement on those from previous spirals.

The LSAT program uses a 'clean slate' design and had no requirements imposed on abiding by contemporary ammunition and weapon standards. Despite this, the program is using the M855 5.56×45mm round to provide comparison with existing weapons. The program has listed scalability of the ammunition calibre as a requirement, and its pursuit of a very light company machine gun would require a larger round. Therefore, the program seems set towards a more accurate, harder-hitting round (such as the 6.5 mm Grendel or 6.8mm Remington SPC).

The program has set itself weight reduction goals over the existing M249 and its ammunition of 35% for the weapon and 40% for the ammunition. Further goals to improve battlefield effectiveness have also been set: improved lethality; improved controllability (through recoil reduction, etc.); improved ergonomics; improved reliability and maintainability; integration of electronics; and equivalent cost and producibility to the existing weapon and ammunition.

== Achievements ==
By 2008, the program had made tremendous progress, with all of its goals either fully achieved or with strong potential for achievement.

=== Light machine gun ===
The LMGs built made a 47% and 43% reduction of weight for the caseless weapon and cased telescoped weapons, respectively. The more complex chamber-sealing mechanism of the caseless weapon somewhat increases its weight compared to the composite-cased weapon. Secondary goals have also been met: the LMG has the potential to improve battlefield effectiveness (due to its simpler and more consistent weapon action, its light weight and low recoil, and its stiffer barrel); its use of recoil compensation (with a long-stroke gas-system, for example) has produced positive feedback regarding controllability; the simpler mechanism of the LMG is both more reliable and easier to maintain; a rounds counter has been integrated to improve maintainability, and the weapon is capable of accepting other electronic devices; improved materials used in the chamber and barrel have reduced heat load on the weapon; and the weapon cost is equivalent to the existing M249.

The LMG design is a traditionally (non-bullpup) laid-out machine-gun. It has many of the capabilities of other light machine guns, such as a quick-change barrel, a vented fore-grip, belt-fed ammunition, an ammunition pouch, and a roughly 600 rpm rate of fire. New features include the unique weight of 9.2 pounds for CT and 9.9 pounds for CL, a rounds counter, and a highly stiff and heat resistant barrel achieved with fluting and special materials. Possibly the most radical part is its firing action: the weapon uses a swinging chamber. The chamber swings around a longitudinal pivot; it swings from horizontally parallel with the pivot (the firing position), to vertically parallel (the feed position), and back again. A long-stroke gas-piston is used to operate this action. A round is fed into the chamber at the feed position using a rammer, and the new round also serves to push a spent or dud round out of the far end of the chamber. Such rounds are pushed forward, parallel to the barrel, and they slide into a separate mechanism that ejects them out of one side of the gun. The advantages of this whole action include its simplicity, its isolation of the chamber from barrel heat, and its positive control of round movement from extraction to ejection. In the caseless firing version of the weapon, another mechanism is introduced to seal the chamber during firing (which is why the caseless weapon is heavier).

=== Assault rifle ===
Design of an LSAT battle rifle began in 2008. Halfway into 2008, the designs are nearing completion. The rifle designs are made to use the same cartridge as developed for the LMG, and this means separate rifles are being designed for the cased and caseless cartridges. Design began with seventeen concepts; after the concepts were investigated and trade-offs were analysed, only two remained for the cased round, and two for the caseless round. The concepts involve two magazine approaches, both of which are focussed on high capacity: one uses the standard approach of placing inside the magazine springs that feed rounds into the weapon; the other uses a 'weapon powered' approach, presumably to reduce the extra weight and space that springs create in magazines. If any of the rifle designs use the same swinging chamber mechanism as the LMG, they should be well suited to a bullpup layout, since the forward ejection of the push-through feed-and-ejection mechanism could easily be extended to achieve full ambidexterity, which is a problematic absence in most bullpups. Even in other configurations, the push-through mechanism lends itself very well to ambidexterity: the G11 demonstrates this. The rifle designs are undergoing the same simulated, structural, and kinematic analyses as the LMG. On May 14, 2014, Textron Systems was awarded a two-year $5.7 million contract for work that included development of a carbine firing cased-telescoped ammunition.

=== Ammunition ===
The cylindrical shape of the ammunition is crucial to the weapon's straight-through feed-and-ejection system, and it is the similar shape of the cased-telescoped ammunition to the caseless-telescoped ammunition that allows the parallel development of the two weapon systems. Telescoped ammunition's most notable benefits include the greater propulsive effectiveness of a telescoped round over standard ammunition, and the shorter feed and action times allowed by the shorter length of a telescoped round (both the cased and caseless designs are roughly 30% shorter). If the weapon and ammunition prove superior to existing weapons, a new caliber may be chosen. An intermediate round with characteristics similar to the 6.5 mm Creedmoor is being considered along with the possibility of using a common round in more roles including GPMG and marksman weapons. While M855 and M855A1 projectiles are being used for comparison and demonstration purposes, consideration is being given to using the creation of lightweight ammo cases as a chance to develop an intermediate caliber cartridge which might replace both the 5.56×45mm and the 7.62×51mm. Suggested characteristics of the cartridge are a 6.5 mm bullet weighing 120 gr that can match the effectiveness of the 7.62×51mm at 1,000 m.

==== Cased ====
The cased ammunition is more advanced in development, partially due to the fewer technical difficulties and the fewer differences with standard ammunition. It has already reached the required technology readiness level of 5. As of 2008, the cased ammunition has been tested for a wide range of operating temperatures, and it has had over 9000 rounds fired (approximately 6500 rounds of Spiral 1 ammunition, and over 2000 of Spiral 2). The second spiral version of the cased ammunition produced a 33% weight reduction (falling just short of the program goal), while the ongoing development of the third spiral of cased ammunition has achieved a roughly 40% reduction. The third spiral is also 30% smaller than standard ammunition. The improvement by the third spiral of cased ammunition over the second spiral was achieved partially by compacting and consolidating the propellant (thereby allowing a smaller cartridge case and round). Having reached a sufficient technology readiness level, the Spiral 2 ammunition is being prepared for a contracted 2000 round delivery. The cased ammunition has shown itself as a virtually risk free option, with present and potential ability grounded in success. In addition, development of the cased ammunition firing weapon has significantly improved understanding of the weapon action and requirements. Cased telescoped ammunition for the LSAT light machine gun reached technology readiness level 7 after 25,000 rounds were fired in trials in 2011.

==== Caseless ====
Having replicated Dynamit Nobel's ACR ammunition, the HITP (High Ignition Temperature Propellant—it is hexogen/octogen based to decrease heat sensitivity) based ammunition was modified to a 5.56 mm round. Tests proved the ammunition's usability, and development of the weapon was advanced using knowledge gained from the cased ammunition version. The Alliant Techsystems ammunition production team has reduced the production time and costs by reducing from fourteen to two the number of steps used to complete processing. The second spiral of caseless ammunition was rolled out in 2008, with the necessary facilities to produce the ammunition in bulk completed. It has vastly reduced the weight and volume of standard ammunition (by 51% and 40%, respectively), and it has reached the verge of achieving Technology Readiness Level 5. The development of the third spiral was also initiated, with the goal of replacing the propellant binder with a binder more environmentally and cost friendly. It also aims to reduce the heat ablation on the inside of the weapon by modifying the burn rate of the propellant, and by giving the round an exterior coating to absorb or prevent transferred heat. Benefits the system has gained from using the caseless ammunition go beyond the unparalleled weight and volume reduction to, for example, the lack of ejected shells (which both improves the weapon's protection from dirt and removes any need to 'police' cases after firing). The ammo was still in development as of 2012.

== See also ==
- Future Combat Systems
- Future Force Warrior
