= Michael Conrad (disambiguation) =

Michael Conrad was an American actor perhaps best known for his portrayal of veteran cop Sgt. Phil Esterhaus on Hill Street Blues.

Michael Conrad may also refer to:

- Michael Conrad (biologist), American theoretical biologist
- Michael Georg Conrad, German writer and philosopher
- Michael J. Conrad, retired United States Army major general
