= Heckler & Koch G11 =

Caseless ammunition assault rifle prototype

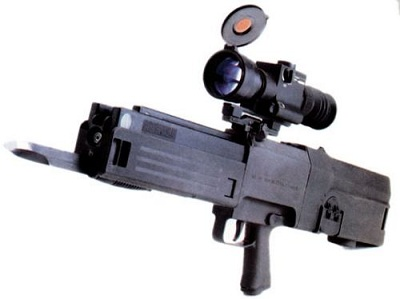
- A G11 K2 (final version).
- Type: Assault rifle
- Place of origin: West Germany

Production history
- Designer: Heckler & Koch
- Designed: 1968–1990
- Variants: Assault rifle; Light machine gun (LMG11)

Specifications
- Mass: 3.65 kg (8.0 lb) empty, 4.3 kg (9.5 lb) loaded with 90 rounds (G11K2)
- Length: 750 mm (30 in)
- Barrel length: 540 mm (21 in) (Not including chamber, 155 mm per twist)
- Cartridge: 4.73×33mm caseless ammunition (DM11): G11 K2, LMG11; 4.7mm, 4.3mm, 4.9mm for other G11 prototypes; 4.92x34mm; 4.73×25mm caseless: NBW
- Action: Gas-operated, rotary breech (for G11 series)
- Rate of fire: 460 rounds/min (full auto); 2100 rounds/min (3-round burst)
- Muzzle velocity: C. 930 m/s (3,100 ft/s)
- Effective firing range: 400 m
- Feed system: 45- or 50-round detachable box magazine
- Sights: Integrated optical sight

The Heckler & Koch G11 is a non-production prototype assault rifle developed from the late 1960s to the 1980s by Gesellschaft für Hülsenlose Gewehrsysteme (GSHG) (German for "Association for Caseless Rifle Systems"), a conglomeration of companies headed by firearm manufacturer Heckler & Koch (mechanical engineering and weapon design), Dynamit Nobel (propellant composition and projectile design), and Hensoldt Wetzlar (target identification and optic systems). The rifle is noted for its use of caseless ammunition.

It was primarily a project of West Germany, though it was of significance to the other NATO countries as well. In particular, versions of the G11 were included in the U.S. Advanced Combat Rifle program.

In 1990, H&K finished the development of the G11, intended for the Bundeswehr and other NATO partners. Although the weapon was a technical success, it never entered full production due to the political changes of German reunification and lack of procurement contract. Only 1000 units were ever produced, some of which made their way into the hands of the Bundeswehr. Ultimately, the German armed forces replaced the G3 with the G36.

== History and development ==
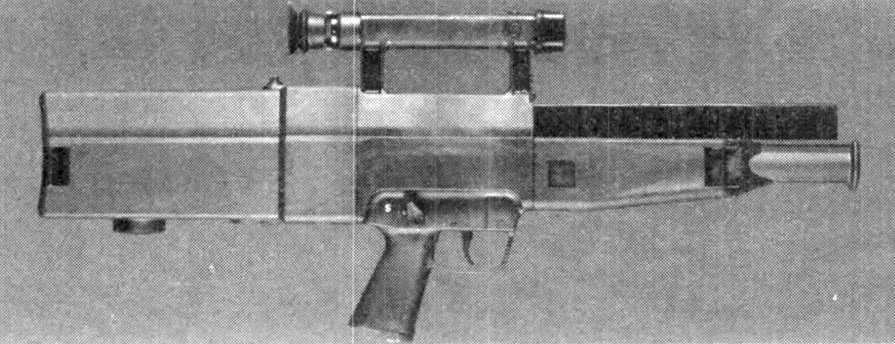
Heckler & Koch ACR prototype

Development began around 1967 when NATO launched the idea of adopting a second standard small-caliber ammunition. Three competitors were then nominated: one American, another Belgian, and finally the German Heckler & Koch. NATO quickly lost interest in caseless ammunition but the West German Government held on. During 1968–1969, the government of West Germany started a feasibility study into a future assault rifle and three contracts were awarded respectively to Diehl, IWKA Mauser and Heckler & Koch. The terms of reference (specifications) were very general, calling for an improved infantry weapon with a better hit probability than any then in existence, yet fulfilling the FINABEL range and rate of fire characteristics. The designers were given a free hand for the methods used, but Heckler & Koch, attempting to obtain improvement, approached the design with radical change in mind.

From the very beginning, it was obvious the required hit probability could not be achieved with common iron sights. An optical sight was H&K's solution. Hensoldt AG, having delivered 100,000 optical sights for the G3, cooperated with H&K on developing a small sight with low power magnification which would allow target acquisition with both eyes. However, it was dropped because of the cost. The weapon was to be short, but only 37 cm would have been left for a sightline, too short for a common iron sight. In mid 1968, Hensoldt presented an affordable reflector sight. It was based on an old and nearly forgotten patent, and a modernized model had to be built by a master from the assembly department. On September 30, 1968, Hensoldt was commissioned for a study for further development.

Numerous studies followed in the period between 1970 and 1971. Intensive tests were run by Heckler & Koch and Dynamit Nobel in search of a suitable ammunition. The early sideways ignition design gave way to a tail ignition design. By 1970, studies progressed far enough to allow the construction of an automatic single- and 3-shot burst model but without full-automatic operation. Sometime in 1970, the box magazine was selected. To study the dispersion, a model firing 9×19mm and equipped with the reflexive sight was used. It had a cadence of 2400 rpm. The study supposedly was conducted by a research institute of the Fraunhofer Society (Fraunhofer-Gesellschaft). To determine the precision, a laser was used, fired onto a film during the 3-shot burst. The free-floating barrel design was found to contribute significantly to the precision of the weapon. At the end of September/beginning October 1971, the weapon was fully completed with full automatic fire and chambered for 4.9 mm and fed from the side.

In January 1973, the defense ministries of West Germany and Great Britain agreed on exchanging information on development of infantry weaponry and ammunition. The agreement was designed to benefit both partners equally. West Germany was to work on caseless ammunition while Great Britain would work on optimizing a firearm for 4.85x45 mm ammunition.

Meanwhile, the German Defence Ministry targeted unveiling of the weapon to NATO in 1975 with a field test of the first weapon to begin in 1976. In the summer of 1973, the ministry took on stock to see that none of the competitors could present a war-ready weapon. Diehl's design used separate magazines for projectile and propellant. Mauser offered a three-barrel rifle design. H&K's design with a rotating breech was considered to be promising. Together with the Federal Office of Defense Technology and Procurement (FODTP) (Bundesamt für Wehrtechnik und Beschaffung), H&K's rotating breech was selected for further study and development.

In early November 1973, at a NATO workshop conference in Brussels, West Germany was appointed to develop the second generation (rifleman) rifle. H&K's new weapon was to be presented in sufficient numbers to NATO in April 1977. NATO-wide testing began in 1977 with the goal of having a second smaller caliber weapon alongside the 7.62×51mm NATO round rifle. West Germany wanted to have it ready by then, but the caliber was changed to 4.3 mm, delaying prototype development by months.

In mid 1974, several fully operational Prototype 1 G11s were presented to the Bundeswehr. On June 14, 1974, the German defense ministry charged the FODTP with initiating the development of the weapon. The proof of performance was held on December 18 and 19, 1974. The achieved firing rates were given as 1800 rpm for burst and 400 rpm for full-automatic. H&K was awarded the development contract (worth 20 million DM) on December 23, 1974. The contract required the completion of development by autumn of 1977, including following field tests. Subsequently, H&K contracted Hensoldt with a continuing development contract. Around 1975, the design was disclosed as a German small arm Laid-Open Patent application No. 23 26 525.0 and No. 24 13 615.0.

In early 1976, doubt about the viability of the reflex sight rose. The contrast requirements in adverse condition and added features like variable brightness and distance settings drove cost up, exceeding that of a proper scope of similar size. On June 11, 1976, it was decided to switch to a scope. On June 15, 1976, the specification for a scope was finalized and the first model presented on August 5/6, 1976. In November 1977, the FODTP changed the specification accordingly. At the end of the contract in the summer of 1978, it was found to satisfy the requirement.

Meanwhile, the caliber was changed to 4.75 mm with Prototype 3. Prototype 4 and Prototype 5 equipped with the scope took part in the preliminary NATO field test in 1977 in Meppen. After the contract with the FODTP ended H&K, Dynamit Nobel and Hensoldt were forced to continue development on their own with their private funds. In 1978, Mauser competed with their own weapon chambered for caliber 4.7 mm in a conventional case design but ultimately lost to the H&K G11. The caseless round was not yet telescoped and appeared "conventional".

On 28 October 1980, NATO approved the standardization (STANAG 4172) of 5.56×45mm NATO as the second small caliber cartridge for use within the alliance.

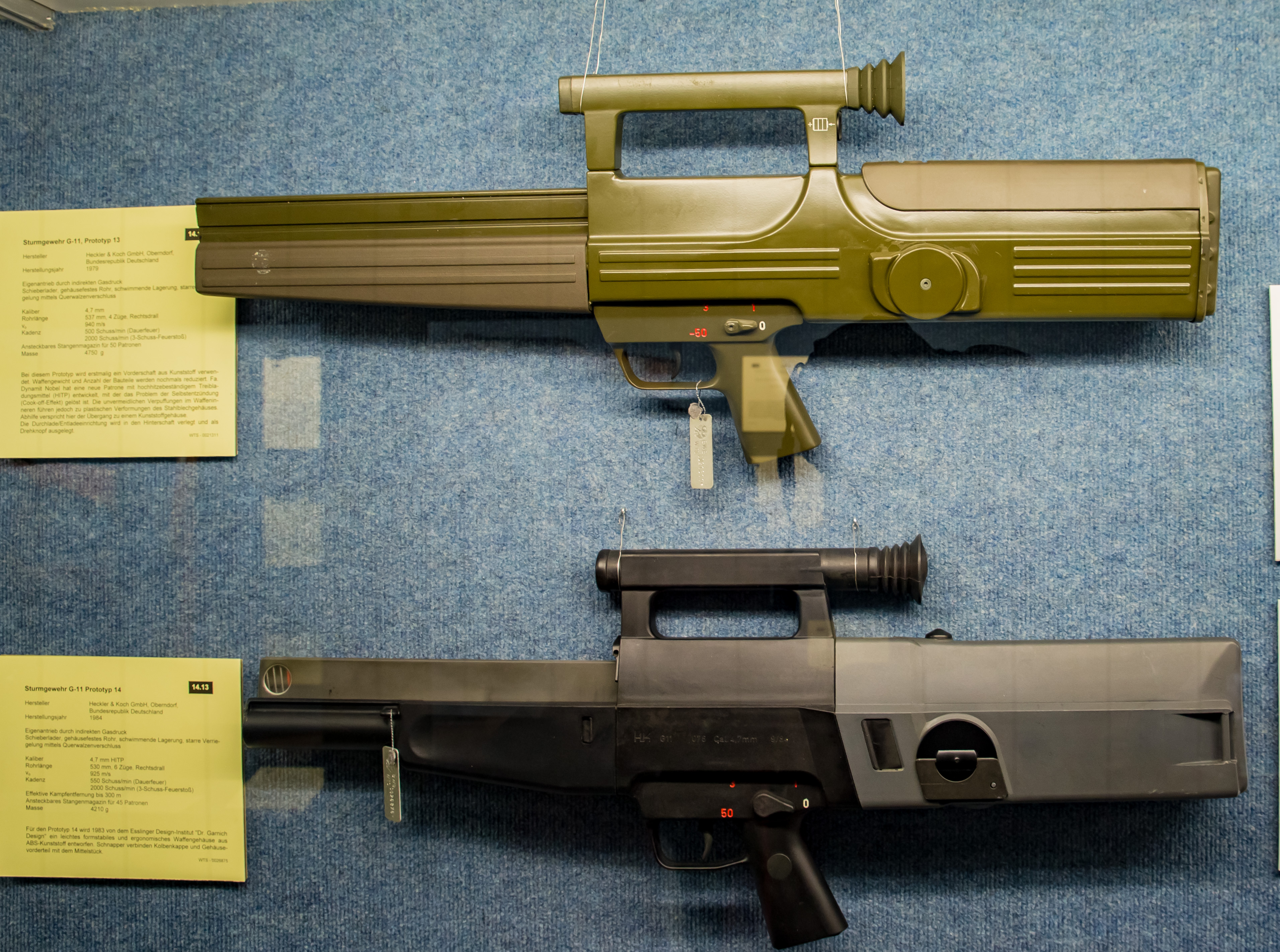
Prototypes 13 (top) and 14 (bottom) in the collection of the Wehrtechnische Studiensammlung Koblenz.

Up to 1982, changes were made following the test. The caliber changed to 4.7×21mm for Prototype 6. The conventional nitro-cellulose propellant was replaced by High Ignition Temperatures Propellant (HITP) based on Octogen. The barrel received polygonal rifling. The rifle case received a design by a dedicated designer. This Prototype 13 became the attention of the numerous media and press, and was the first version entering the Advanced Combat Rifle (ACR) program.

Meanwhile, development shifted yet again to the new caliber 4.73×33mm (DM11) in a telescoped form. In 1984, the Gesellschaft für hülsenlose Gewehrsysteme (GHGS), founded by H&K GmbH and Dynamit Nobel AG, completed a license agreement for a custom version (worth US$3.8 million) with the U.S. Department of Defense and for the adoption of caseless ammunition with the Bundeswehr and NATO.

On December 8, 1986, Hensoldt was ready to deliver the final "Zieloptik ZO 1".

The G11 K1 (K for Konfiguration) production model was completed in March 1987. Field test and troop trials began in June with the Bundeswehr in Hammelburg and lasted until January 1989. It achieved a 100% higher Ph than the G3. The final development of the ammunition was completed toward the end of 1988 with the same dimensions as 4 years earlier. In March 1989, the first Operator´s Manual was made for the G11 K1 for the ACR evaluation. By then, work had already started on the G11 K2. On March 3, 1989, the first five ACR units were shipped to the Aberdeen Proving Ground. In May, H&K began to instruct the testers on how to operate the weapon.

In April 1990, the FODTP certified the G11 for use with the Bundeswehr. In May 1990, Tilo Möller, then H&K chief of R&D, presented the G11 to military dignitaries. At the same time, the Cabinet of Germany confirmed questions by the Bundestag about the signing of a contract in early 1990 for the adoption of the G11 and that it is part the budget (Haushalt 1990 EPL 14). If it is adopted, the front line troops would receive it first. Adoption numbers would be guided by yearly planned G3 replacement numbers up to the year 2002. The volume of a contract for the Bundeswehr alone was to cover 300,000 units worth 2.7 billion DM. The Cabinet of Germany confirmed that 30 million DM were reserved in the 1989 budget and another planned for the 1990 budget.

In April 1990, the ACR program ended with the decision not to adopt any of the ACR rifles because none met the requirement of doubling hit probability. It was not until mid September 1990 that H&K found out about the cancelation of the preproduction contract.

In November 1990, the Treaty on Conventional Armed Forces in Europe (CFE) was signed, which puts limits on the numbers of conventional military equipment in Europe and mandates the destruction of excess weaponry.

In January 1992, the Federal Audit Office (Bundesrechnungshof) recommended not to procure the G11 just yet and Defense Minister Gerhard Stoltenberg struck the G11 from the procurement list. On April 1, 1990, the Warsaw Pact dissolved, leaving West Germany with a surplus of hundreds of thousands of Kalashnikovs. The development of the G11 from 1974 to 1989 had cost the tax payer 84.1 million DM, while leaving H&K with a debt of 180 million DM. H&K was permitted by the Federal Office of Economics and Export Control (Bundesamt für Wirtschaft und Ausfuhrkontrolle) to export the rifle to 80 countries, and give licenses to 15 countries. On March 8, 1992, the G11 (K2) was approved for full scale replacement production.

On July 17, 1992, the CFE treaty went into effect.

In June 1993, the situation became clear when it was announced that the G11 could not be adopted due to "lack of possibility for NATO standardization".

In 2004, the Lightweight Small Arms Technologies (LSAT) program was initiated, which licensed the G11 caseless ammunition. In Phase 1 lasting until January 2005, the HITP formula was reverse engineered and evaluated. In the 28-month-long Phase II, the G11 caseless ammunition was replicated and customized to U.S. Army preferences (higher burn rate). In May 2007, the caseless ammunition was scaled and adapted to the 5.56 mm projectile in a telescoped and round form. An alternative polymer cased version was created in parallel.

== Design details ==
4.73×33mm
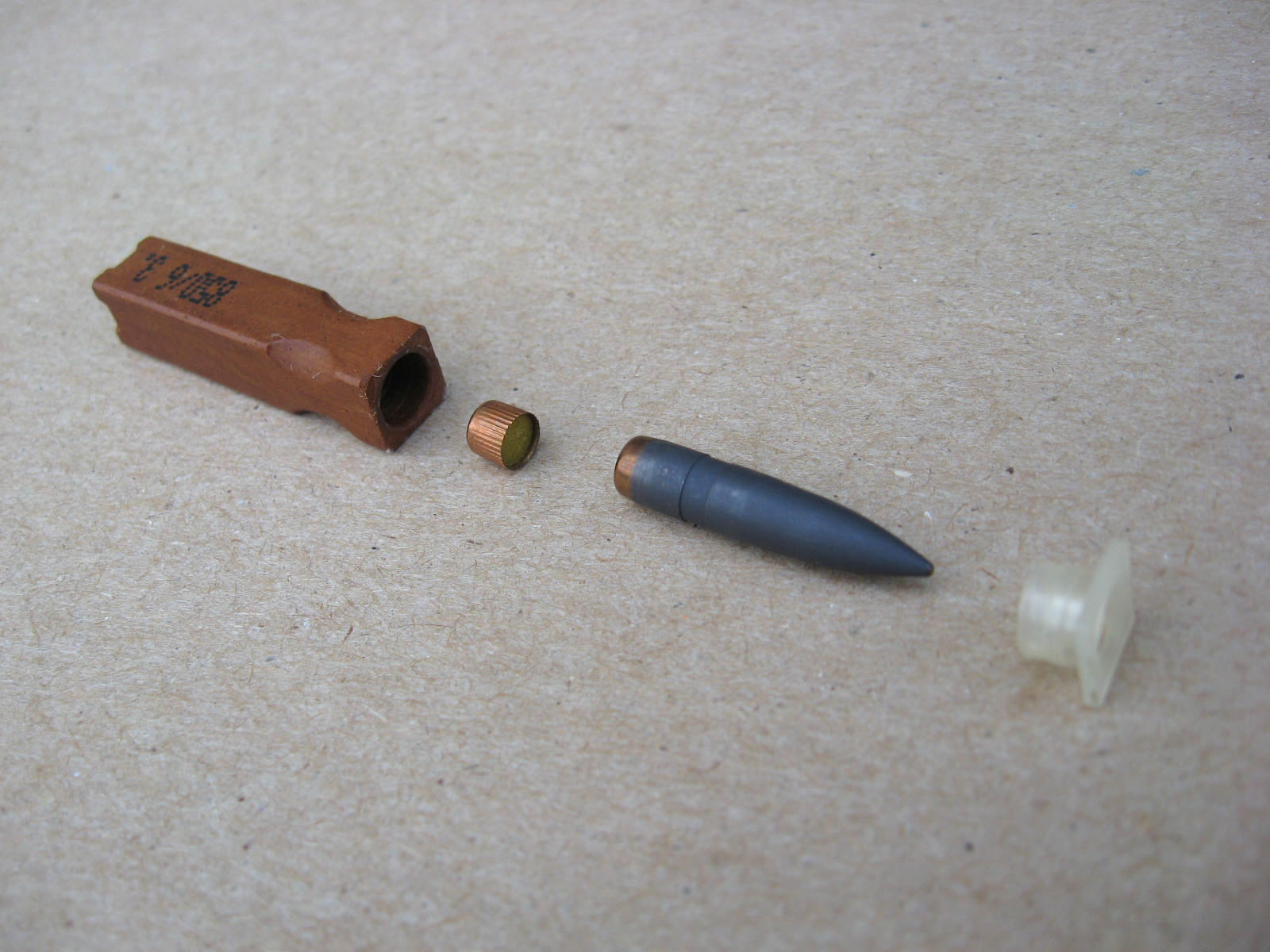
- The 4.73×33mm caseless ammunition used in the G11 rifle. The components are, from left to right, the solid propellant, primer, the bullet, and a plastic cap that serves to keep the bullet centered in the propellant block.
- Type: Rifle
- Place of origin: Germany

Production history
- Designer: Heckler & Koch

Specifications
- Case type: Caseless
- Bullet diameter: 4.92 mm (0.194 in)
- Base diameter: 7.76 mm (0.306 in)
- Overall length: 32.83 mm (1.293 in)
- Rifling twist: 155 mm (1 in 6.1 in)
- Maximum pressure: 385.00 MPa (55,840 psi)

Ballistic performance
Bullet mass/type	Velocity	Energy
3.33 g (51 gr) FMJBT	925 m/s (3,030 ft/s)	1,416 J (1,044 ft⋅lbf)
- Test barrel length: 540 mm (21 in)

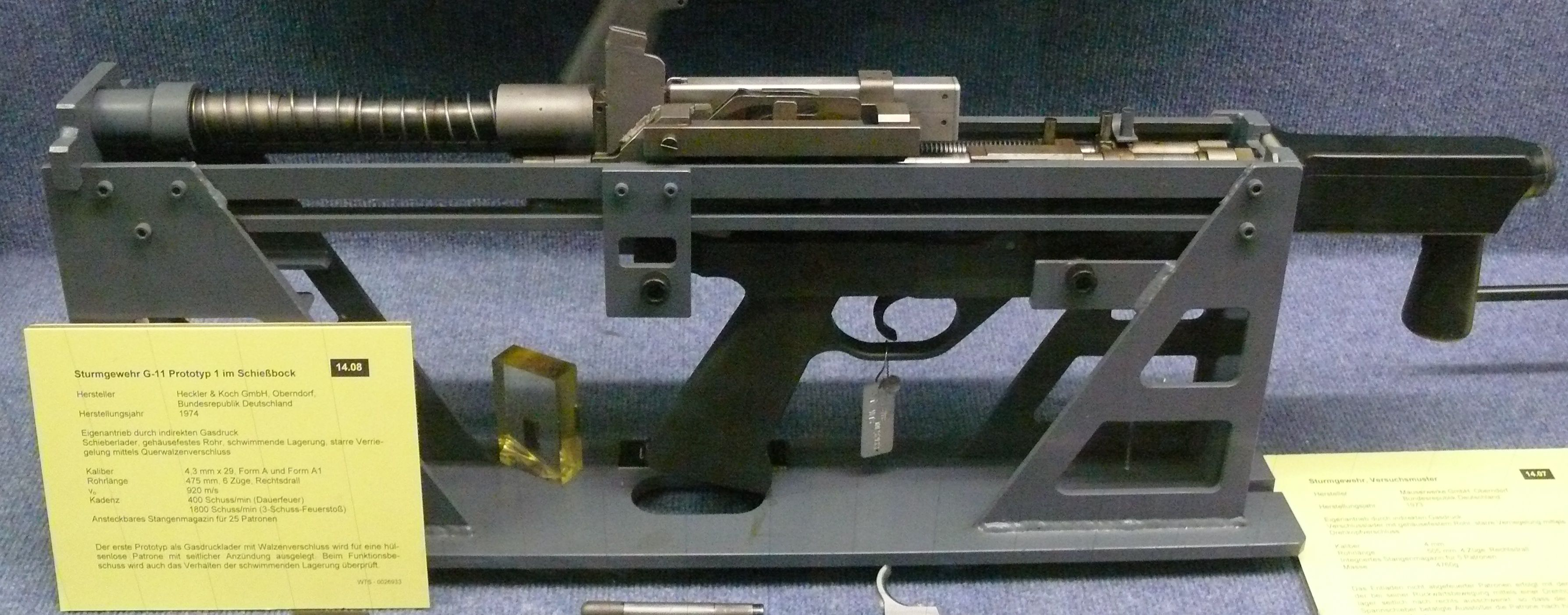
An early functioning prototype of the G11 mechanism.

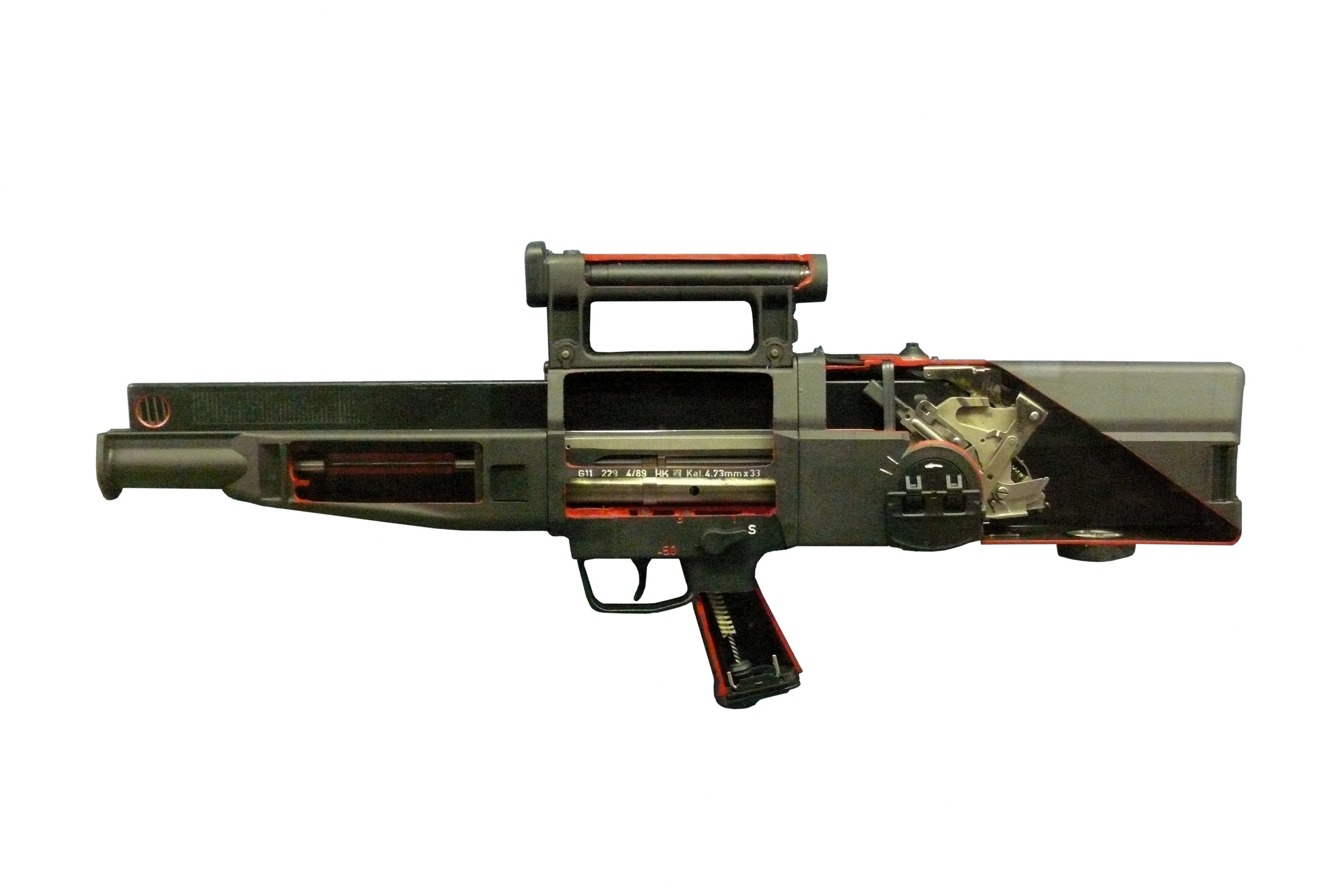
A sectional of the final prototype.

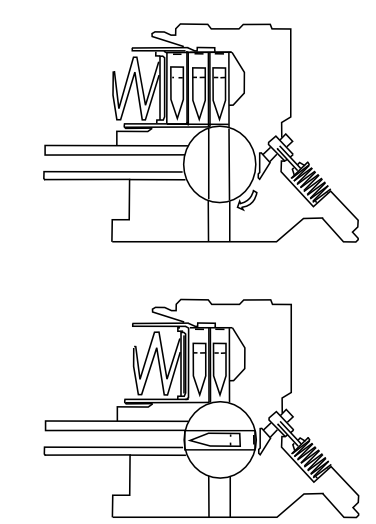
This diagram illustrates the G11's unique feeding cycle.

The weapon uses 4.73×33mm caseless ammunition, with the propellant shaped into cuboid blocks. The ammunition has also been designated as 4.92mm for the HK G11 ACR, a variant developed for US Military trials, the US convention of groove to groove measurements of the bore was employed, rather than land-land. The projectile is 4.92 mm in diameter with a case length of 33 mm, the US case length measurement is 34 mm since for the ACR trials the chamber length, not the actual case length was used. The 4.73 mm round is half the weight and 40% the size by volume of the 5.56×45mm NATO round. The round was designed to the same ballistics requirement as the 5.56×45mm NATO round as outlined in Evaluation Procedures for Future NATO Weapons Systems (Document 14). However, the 4.73mm is much less likely to tumble when hitting or penetrating a soft target, and thus not as lethal. The effect on soft targets is in accordance with international conventions. Even at short range, the round does not fragment in the soft target medium. This was confirmed in tests with gelatine.(See terminal ballistics)

The design principle was to increase target hit probability by firing high rate multi-round bursts (salvos). Tests have been run using a prototype shotgun test-bed called CAWS to see whether a single-shot, multi-projectile system could achieve the range and hit probability requirements. The results indicated that the use of serially fired projectiles at a high rate of fire would achieve a tight shotgun-like pattern with rifle-like accuracy up to the required range.

The rifle was designed to have a dispersion such that a man-target running at a speed of 6 km/h at a distance of 250 m would be hit even if the lead angle error (2 mil) was off by 51 cm.

The weapon itself has three firing modes: semi-auto, full-auto at 460 rounds per minute, and three-round burst at over 2100 cyclic rounds per minute, or approximately 36 rounds per second. The loading and feed mechanism is physically very complicated but exceptionally fast and reliable. Rounds are fed into the weapon from a magazine that lies above and parallel with the barrel. The rounds are oriented vertically (at 90 degrees to the bore) and are fed downwards into the rotary chamber so that they can be rotated 90 degrees for firing. The firing cycle process is roughly:

1. As the cocking handle on the side is rotated clockwise by the weapon operator:
2. A round is dropped into the revolving chamber vertically (a loading piston assists).
3. The chamber rotates 90° so it is lined up with the barrel. This completes the chambering of the round and cocking of the firing pin.
4. When the trigger is pulled, a firing pin ignites the primer, which then ignites a powder booster charge that pushes the bullet into the barrel. The solid block of propellant is broken up to increase the ignition surface area and ignites, accelerating the bullet out of the barrel.
5. As the projectile is accelerating up the barrel, recoil forces drive the barrel, magazine, chamber and operating mechanism rearwards within the weapon, dissipating energy for single shot and fully automatic modes but allowing burst mode to deliver three projectiles downrange before buffering occurs.
6. Gas tapped off from the barrel rotates the chamber and actuates the loading mechanism, then rotating the chamber back to the initial vertical position until it is lined up with the feed mechanism and the process repeats.

A conventional assault rifle has approximately eight steps in its cycle:

1. Battery: bolt group pushes round from magazine into chamber.
2. Lockup: bolt or bolt carrier locks with the barrel extension or receiver.
3. Firing: firing pin or striker impacts primer igniting the main propellant charge.
4. Unlocking: either through gas, recoil or blow-back operation, the working parts unlock from the barrel extension or receiver.
5. Extraction: spent case is extracted and withdrawn from the chamber.
6. Ejection: the spent case is thrown clear of the weapon either via a bolt face ejector or from a fixed or semi-fixed ejector.
7. Firing mechanism reset: as part of the rearward reciprocation of the working parts, the firing mechanism is reset.
8. Buffering: working parts finally strike the buffer and halt. Recoil spring(s) are fully compressed and begin to drive the working parts forward into battery.

Because the G11 uses caseless ammunition, there are no extraction and ejection steps. Even though the rotary chamber does not lock up in the true sense of the word, the fact that it has to rotate in and out of alignment with the barrel means that the G11 can be considered to have a lock/unlock phase. If a round fails to fire or the weapon is being used with training rounds, the rifle can be manually unloaded by twisting the cocking handle counterclockwise. This pushes the failed/training round out an emergency ejection port on the bottom of the rifle and loads the next round.

The recoil in the three-round burst is not felt by the weapon's user until after the third round has left the chamber. This is accomplished by having the barrel and feeding mechanism "float" within the rifle casing. When the rounds are fired, the barrel, magazine, chamber and operating mechanism recoils back against recoil springs several inches. Only when it strikes the buffer at the back of the rifle does the user feel the recoil. During the rearward travel of the internal mechanism the rifle loads and fires 3 rounds. When the barrel and mechanism reaches the rearmost point in its travel, the recoil springs push it forward, back into its normal forward position. When firing in semi-auto and full-auto modes, the rifle loads and fires only one round per movement of the internal mechanism. Fully automatic fire is reduced to around 460 rounds per minute.

The internal workings of the rifle were rather complex compared to those of some earlier designs, with the mechanism being compared to the inside of a compact clock. The number of hours of maintenance required for the G11 compared to other designs is not clear, especially since the effect of the powder used in the caseless ammo remains unknown. Designers claimed that, because there was no ejection cycle, the internal mechanisms would have little chance to get exposed to external dust, dirt and sand, which would supposedly reduce the need for cleaning.

There were reports that the high tolerances required to seal off the front and rear chamber openings set the expected life of the contacting parts to 6000 rounds before maintenance was required.

=== Ammunition cook-off and shape ===
Premature ignition of ammunition from heat in the chamber, known as cook-off, was a major problem with early prototypes of the G11 where synthetically bound nitrocellulose, formed into blocks, was used. Normally, when a cartridge is fed into a chamber, its case insulates the propellant from igniting until its impact-sensitive primer is struck by a firing pin or striker. The case aids in insulating the propellant from the heat of the chamber and it takes time for the temperature to rise sufficiently inside a chambered round to ignite the propellant. In addition, in a traditional rifle, extracting a hot case removes heat from the system. As a result of doing away with traditional cases, the G11 was found to be unsafe and had to be withdrawn from the 1979 NATO trials. The high rate of fire and lack of cartridge cases made cooking off a significant problem; the heat buildup in the G11 chamber was immense because the chamber had no provision for cooling like a reciprocating bolt system, which allows hot air to leave the chamber when the bolt is retracted and the chamber is exposed to air. The vertically swiveling chamber also made gas sealing at each end at such high pressures impractical, as opposed to a cross-sectional round-inside-round bolt-to-chamber fit with proper gas sealing.

To solve this, Heckler and Koch formed a partnership with Dynamit Nobel, which redesigned the cartridge to use a new high ignition temperature propellant (HITP). The cook-off problem was reduced by using a denatured HMX propellant with a special binder and coating for the ammunition that increased the spontaneous ignition temperature by another 100 °C above that of standard, nitrocellulose (180 °C) propellant.

A notable feature of the new round was its unconventional shape. Most cartridge casings are cylindrical, but the redesigned cartridge was molded into a squared, box-like shape. This allowed the 50-cartridge magazine to carry more propellant in a smaller space; the wasted space between rounds with cylindrical casings was substantially reduced.

The issue of heat removal from caseless-firing weapons as well as methods of igniting them continue to be researched by other companies. An alternative route was taken by the Austrian company Voere, whose Voere VEC-91 uses a caseless, electrically-fired round developed by Austrian inventor Hubert Usel. This technique makes it possible to greatly increase the ignition temperature without hampering the ability to fire it. This would increase the maximum rate and duration a gun could fire before cooking off rounds, but the VEC-91 never took advantage of this, since it was a bolt-action rifle.

The 4.73×33mm projectile was required to defeat NATO and Warsaw Pact armor at 300–400 m (Document 14) but was advertised to meet the requirement at 600 m. This fact was neither confirmed nor denied by the West German government, citing inability to disclose such information.

In line with another NATO requirement for a personal defense weapon (PDW), a handgun concept, Nahbereichswaffe (NBW), was created. It was to use a shortened 4.73×25 mm cartridge and meet the same requirements now fulfilled by the HK 4.6×30mm: Armor piercing of NATO CRISAT Technology Area 1 (TA1) out to 300 m; Level II out to 25 m; lethal suppression fire against unarmored targets out to 450 m.

Cartridge	Cartridge weight	Projectile weight	Weight of loaded magazine	example ammo. load	Pressure	Velocity	Energy	Recoil Energy Factor (Impulse²)
4.73×33 mm	5.2 g	3.25 g	45 rd mag @0.25 kg 15 rd reload @0.11 kg	2 mags + 28 reloading units 3.58 kg total for 510 rds	3850 bar	930 m/s	1470 J/ft lb	28
4.73×25 mm	4 g	2.75 g	20–40 rd mag		2750 bar	585 m/s	280+ J @range	

== Future development ==
By 2004, the technology developed for the G11 was licensed for the Lightweight Small Arms Technologies project, the current project of which is a light machine gun prototype for the US Army. The design is intended to use either a cased cartridge using a composite case or a caseless ammunition design developed from the G11. Both ammunition designs are telescoped ammunition like that used by the G11; however, the current ammunition design has a plastic case instead of the fully caseless G11 ammunition. The design, like the G11, uses a rotating chamber, but rotating about the longitudinal axis of the weapon.

== See also ==
- AAI ACR – Competed with the G11 in weapons testing trials in the Advanced Combat Rifle program
- AN-94 – Russian assault rifle with delayed recoil
- Armtech C30R – Australian assault rifle prototype similar to the G11
- Benelli CB M2 – Italian submachine gun prototype that used semi-caseless ammunition
- Gerasimenko VAG-73 – Russian machine pistol with caseless ammunition
- List of assault rifles
- List of bullpup firearms
- List of machine guns
- Metal Storm – Made guns that used caseless ammunition
- Scicon IW – British concept for a rifle with caseless ammunition
- Steyr ACR – Another weapon entered into the Advanced Combat Rifle program
- Voere VEC-91 – Austrian rifle that uses caseless ammunition
