= Peter C. Lemon =

American soldier

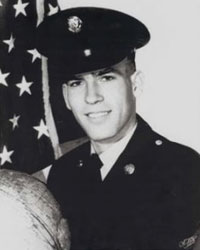
- Born: June 5, 1950 (age 76); Toronto, Ontario, Canada
- Military career
- Allegiance: United States
- Branch: United States Army
- Service years: 1969-71
- Rank: Sergeant
- Units: Company E RECON, 2/8 1st Cavalry Division; I Company 75th Rangers, 1st Division
- Conflicts: Vietnam War
- Awards: Medal of Honor; Bronze Star Medal (2); Air Medal (2); Army Commendation Medal; Purple Heart

Peter Charles Lemon (born June 5, 1950) is a former United States Army soldier and a recipient of the United States military's highest award for valor, the Medal of Honor. He received the award for his actions on April 1, 1970, while serving in Tây Ninh Province during the Vietnam War. He dedicated his award to the three comrades he lost in the battle for which he received the award: Casey Waller, Nathan Mann, Brent Street. Lemon is the only Canadian-born United States citizen to be presented the medal for fighting in the Vietnam War. He is the eighth-youngest living Medal of Honor recipient.

== Early life and education ==
Lemon was born in Toronto, Canada, on June 5, 1950. He is a 1968 graduate from the Tawas Area High School, Tawas City, Michigan. Viewing the Vietnam War as necessary to stop the spread of communism, he volunteered to enter the United States Army at the East Tawas Post Office, East Tawas, Michigan. After his Army service, he attended Colorado State University, graduating in 1979 with a degree in speech. He received an M.S. in business administration from the University of Northern Colorado in 1981, and in 1998 he was proclaimed the institution's "Humanitarian Alum of the Year."

== Career ==
Lemon was a motivational speaker, the author of the book Beyond the Medal, and executive producer of the PBS special Beyond the Medal of Honor. His book and documentary have been donated to every high school in the United States to inspire American children "to be worthy citizens."

Lemon has also run several corporations, including American Hospitality Association, Inc.; Darnell-Lemon, Inc.; and Probus, Inc.

On May 1, 2009, Lemon was presented with the "Outstanding American by Choice" award by President Barack Obama at the White House, recognizing his life of professional achievement and civic contribution. This is the first time the award was presented by the President of the United States.

Lemon is an inductee in the elite Ranger Hall of Fame. A marble tribute honoring Lemon is present in Veteran's Park in Tawas City, Michigan.

The state of Michigan, directed by the governor, dedicated highway US 23 in Tawas City to Mr. Lemon reading “Peter C. Lemon Highway - Congressional Medal of Honor, Outstanding American by Choice.”

In October 2024, Lemon joined 15 other Medal of Honor recipients in publicly endorsing Donald Trump for president.

== Medal of Honor citation ==
Rank and organization: Sergeant, U.S. Army, Company E, 2d Battalion, 8th Cavalry, 1st Cavalry Division. Place and date: Tay Ninh province, Republic of Vietnam, April 1, 1970. Entered service at: Tawas City, Mich. Born: June 5, 1950, Toronto, Ontario, Canada.

Citation:

For conspicuous gallantry and intrepidity in action at the risk of his life above and beyond the call of duty. Sgt. Lemon (then Sp4), Company E, distinguished himself while serving as an assistant machine gunner during the defense of Fire Support Base Illingworth. When the base came under heavy enemy attack, Sgt. Lemon engaged a numerically superior enemy with machine gun and rifle fire from his defensive position until both weapons malfunctioned. He then used hand grenades to fend off the intensified enemy attack launched in his direction. After eliminating all but 1 of the enemy soldiers in the immediate vicinity, he pursued and disposed of the remaining soldier in hand-to-hand combat. Despite fragment wounds from an exploding grenade, Sgt. Lemon regained his position, carried a more seriously wounded comrade to an aid station, and, as he returned, was wounded a second time by enemy fire. Disregarding his personal injuries, he moved to his position through a hail of small arms and grenade fire. Sgt. Lemon immediately realized that the defensive sector was in danger of being overrun by the enemy and unhesitatingly assaulted the enemy soldiers by throwing hand grenades and engaging in hand-to-hand combat. He was wounded yet a third time, but his determined efforts successfully drove the enemy from the position. Securing an operable machine gun, Sgt. Lemon stood atop an embankment fully exposed to enemy fire, and placed effective fire upon the enemy until he collapsed from his multiple wounds and exhaustion. After regaining consciousness at the aid station, he refused medical evacuation until his more seriously wounded comrades had been evacuated. Sgt. Lemon's gallantry and extraordinary heroism, above and beyond the call of duty, are in keeping with the highest traditions of the military service and reflect great credit on him, his unit, and the U.S. Army.

== Awards and decorations ==
- Medal of Honor
- Bronze Star Medal with bronze Oak Leaf Cluster
- Air Medal with bronze Oak Leaf Cluster
- Army Commendation Medal
- Good Conduct Medal
- Purple Heart
- National Defense Service Medal
- Vietnam Service Medal
- Republic of Vietnam Gallantry Cross
- Republic of Vietnam Civil Actions Medal
- Republic of Vietnam Campaign Medal
- Combat Infantryman Badge
- Ranger Tab

== See also ==
- List of Medal of Honor recipients for the Vietnam War
