= Colt ACR =

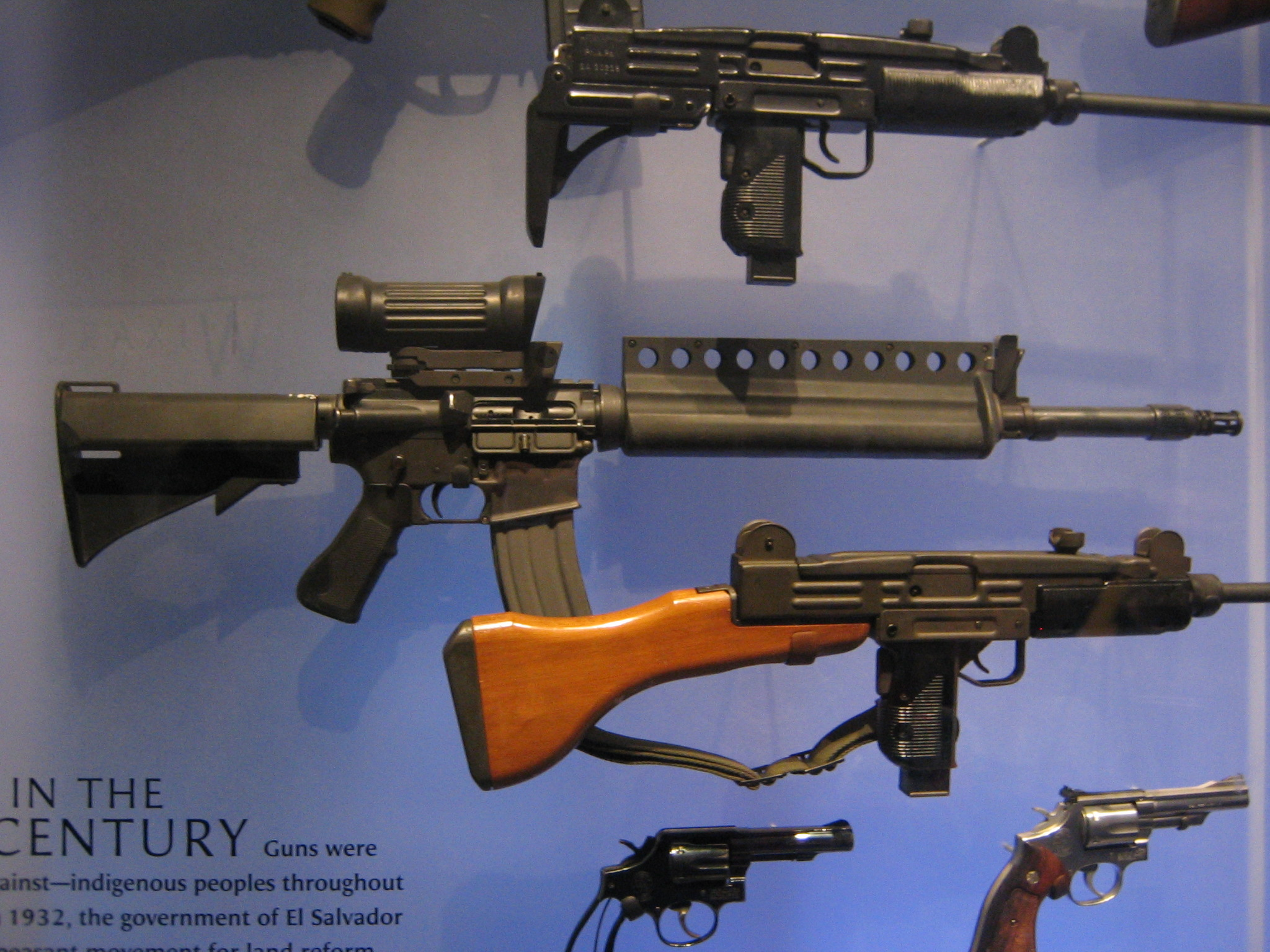
- Colt ACR/M16A2E2 (centre)
- Type: Assault rifle
- Place of origin: United States

Production history
- Designer: Colt's Manufacturing Company
- Designed: 1982
- Manufacturer: Colt's Manufacturing Company

Specifications
- Mass: 3.306 kg (7.29 lb) without magazine and sight
- Length: 1,031 mm (40.6 in) (Stock extended); 933 mm (36.7 in) (Stock retracted)
- Cartridge: 5.56×45mm M855 or duplex
- Action: Gas-operated, rotating bolt (direct impingement)
- Rate of fire: 650 rounds/min
- Muzzle velocity: 948 m/s (3,110 ft/s) (M855); 884 m/s (2,900 ft/s) (duplex)
- Effective firing range: 325 m (355 yd) (duplex ammunition)
- Feed system: 30-cartridge detachable box magazine
- Sights: ×3.5 telescope or interchangeable iron sight

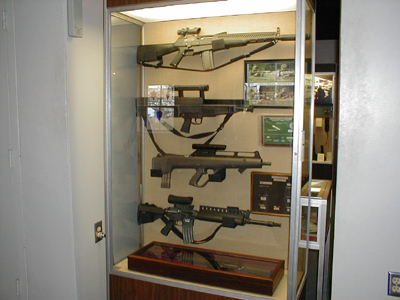
From top to bottom, The final four ACR test rifles from AAI, H&K, Steyr, and Colt

The Colt ACR was Colt's entry in the U.S. DoD Advanced Combat Rifle program, which concluded with the result that none of the entrants achieved enough of an improvement over the M16 to be worth the cost.

The Colt ACR was not a total loss, however; the scope went on to be offered by Elcan as the C79, a version of which was eventually adopted as the M145 Machine Gun Optic used on a number of firearms, especially those from Diemaco (now Colt Canada).

As well, a small batch of stocks during testing were cut-down to a smaller size similar to a CAR-15 buttstock. An example made its way to David Armstrong who used it as a basis for the design of the SOPMOD stock and another went to Magpul.

== Overview ==
The main differences of the Colt ACR and the M16A2 is the distinctive furniture. The handguard included a heat-resistant inner lining, vent holes for lightening and air cooling with a thickened ring around the front end to act as a handstop. This was topped with an elevated sight track rib with a white stripe to improve fast target acquisition. The pistol grip was longer and of a different profile than a traditional M16A2, and the rifle featured ambidextrous fire control selectors, removable scope and a streamlined 6 position telescopic stock. Lastly the rifle featured a flash-hider and a Muzzle Brake Compensator (MBC) designed to reduce recoil and compensate for muzzle climb.

Internally, an oil spring buffer was added to the lower receiver to control the cyclic rate and help reduce felt recoil. Combined with the MBC, these changes reduced felt recoil by 40 percent compared to a standard M16A2.

=== Ammunition ===
The key design change was the use of "duplex rounds", a single cartridge with two bullets in it. Olin Corporation produced three different rounds for testing, the first consisting of two tungsten projectiles in a long-necked case, the second used a standard-length case with two 1.7 grams (27 gr), 4.0-millimetre (0.158 in) tungsten projectiles, and the final entry was another standard-length case with two 5.7-millimetre (0.224 in) projectiles, one 2.3 grams (35 gr) the other 2.1 g (33 gr). The latter was eventually selected for submission to the ACR trials. The basic idea of the duplex load is to increase the number of projectiles fired, which is the primary determinant of battlefield casualties. However, they significantly reduced accuracy, leading to a maximum effective range of 325 m (1,066 ft) and requiring the user to also carry traditional ammunition for long-range shots.

== See also ==
- AAI ACR
- Steyr ACR
- HK ACR
- Colt Automatic Rifle
- Project Abakan
- Buck and ball
- List of assault rifles
