= Night Walk (novel) =

1967 book by Bob Shaw

- First edition (publ. Banner); Cover art by Frank Frazetta
- Author: Bob Shaw
- Language: English
- Publication date: 1967

Night Walk is a science fiction novel by Bob Shaw, first published in 1967. It was his first novel.

== Plot ==
Emm Luther is a planet ruled by a single, worldwide theocracy. It is evenly populated, and a couple of railroads run up and down the coasts of the largest continent. Earth sends secret agent Sam Tallon to Emm Luther to infiltrate the theocracy and extract the coordinates of the "null-space" (hyperspace) jump points of a newly discovered colonizable world, a closely guarded secret.

When the religious secret police discover that he has false credentials and has entered their world under false pretenses, a frantic chase and flight ensues. He is captured in his hotel room. A high-ranking officer named Cherkassky tries to render Tallon harmless by erasing his memory of the jump data, using a device called a "brain brush". He thinks that he has succeeded, but Tallon is equipped with a gadget that can sequester certain memories. Cherkassky enjoys tormenting people, and he is known for destroying most of the memories of prisoners who annoy him. He begins by erasing Tallon's memory of a loved one; the sense of loss enrages Tallon, and he attacks Cherkassky in a bid for escape. He is blinded when Cherkassky shoots him in the face with a dart gun, destroying his eyes. He is taken to a secret prison complex in the southernmost tip of the most distant continent to convalesce. While he is there, he enlists the aid of the scientific elite among the other political prisoners there, and together they design a pair of electronic "sonar" eyes. The headgear delivers different tones to distinguish various objects. Later, they make another breakthrough: they make a device that can sense and interpret the nerve signals of the eyes of nearby living things. Tallon can now see, but only through others' eyes. After they develop and test this device, Tallon and his partner Winfield try to break out, but Winfield is shot during the attempt. Tallon must flee alone, depending on encountering local animal life in order to see.

Tallon escapes and travels across the continent, reaching his secret contact after much difficulty, and with the help of his love interest Helen Juste. When he has a chance to escape the planet, though, he is delayed by trying to bring his lover with him. Later, when he does try to depart, he finds that his ship is filled with police. Battle ensues, and he seems to be the sole survivor. He boards the ship and starts a null-space jump to a random point in the universe. Now blind since there isn't anyone in the ship, he must somehow master the intricacies of the "jump stick," a form of jump drive via portals to null-space (a hyperspace parallel universe, through which FTL space travel is achieved). However, further trouble arrives in the form of Cherkassky, who also survived the battle for the ship. They fight, and Cherkassky is killed. Tallon finds a mouse to function as his eyes. He solves the mathematical problems concerning null-space travel by discovering that he can also see through the eyes of people in other ships traversing various routes through null-space. He gains knowledge of the structure of null-space (a Kummer surface) that space travelers will find invaluable. He eventually reaches home with his enemy (and some loved ones) dead, but his new knowledge helps bring about greater peace.
