= Steyr ACR =

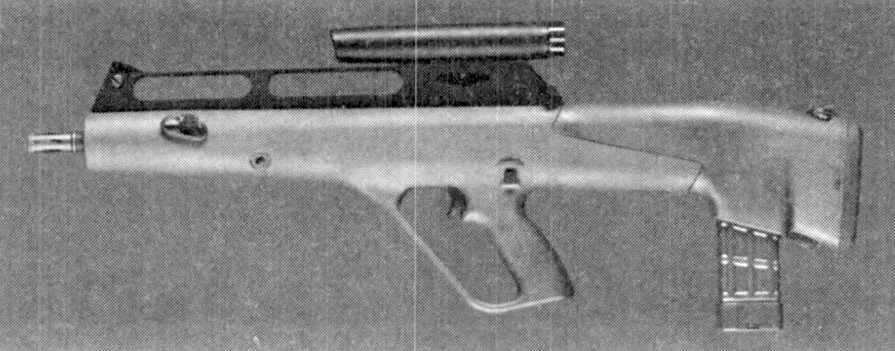
- Steyr Advanced Combat Rifle entry
- Type: Bullpup assault rifle/Flechette rifle
- Place of origin: Austria

Service history
- Used by: United States (experimental)

Production history
- Designer: Ulrich Zedrosser
- Designed: 1987
- Manufacturer: Steyr Mannlicher

Specifications
- Mass: 7.12 lb (3.2 kg) (unloaded)
- Length: 30.7 in (780 mm)
- Barrel length: 21.3 in (540 mm)
- Cartridge: 5.56×45mm annular-primed SCF (synthetic case flechette)
- Caliber: 5.56mm (Sabot Diameter)
- Action: Gas-operated, vertically sliding chamber
- Rate of fire: Semi automatic 3-round burst at 1200rpm cyclic rounds per minute
- Muzzle velocity: 4,757 ft/s (1,450 m/s)
- Feed system: 24-round translucent detachable box magazine
- Sights: Iron or Dual Power Optical sights

The Steyr ACR was a prototype flechette-firing assault rifle built for the US Army's Advanced Combat Rifle program of 1989/90. Although the Steyr design proved effective, as did most of the weapons submitted, the entire ACR program ended with none of the entrants achieving performance 100% better than the M16A2, the baseline for a successful ACR weapon.

== Design ==
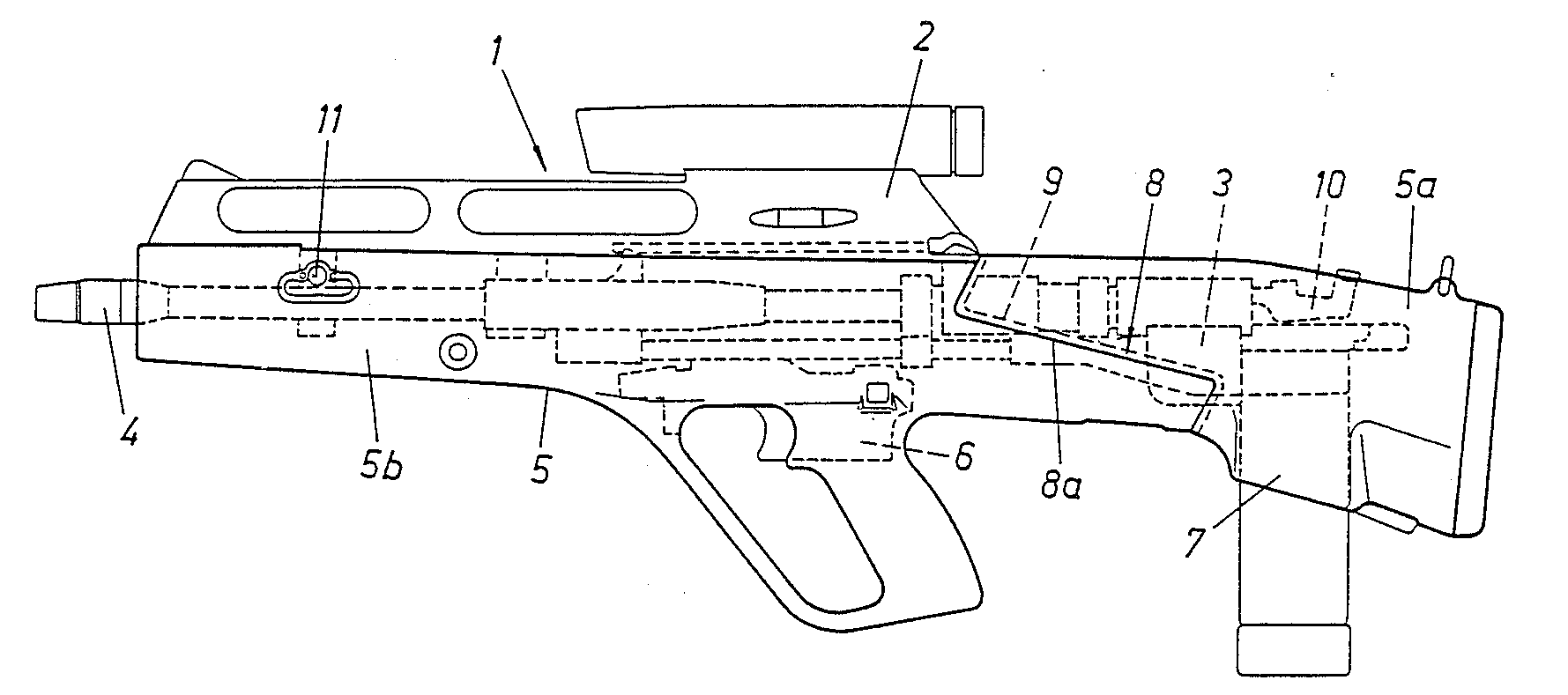
Steyr ACR layout schematic

The Steyr ACR has some superficial resemblance to the Steyr AUG, although it is rounder and the barrel is covered for almost its entire length, as opposed to the AUG where much of the barrel was exposed. Like the AUG, the ACR is a bullpup design with the 24-round magazine located quite close to the buttstock of the gun. The stock was "split" from the magazine forward to a location just below the sights to open for cleaning. An optical sight was included as a standard feature.

The Steyr employed a unique system to cycle through ammunition: instead of driving rounds forward into the chamber and being held in place by a locking bolt, the entire chamber traveled vertically the width of the round. After firing the gases "blew" the chamber vertically downward, where a new round was forced into the chamber from the rear, forcing the old round out an ejection port ahead of the magazine. Springs then raised the chamber back into position where it was locked into a fixed block. The firing pin was fixed above the chamber, entering through a small hole and striking the ring of primer to fire. The chamber was normally held in the "down" position, the trigger releasing it to allow the springs to drive it upward and fire.

== Ammunition ==
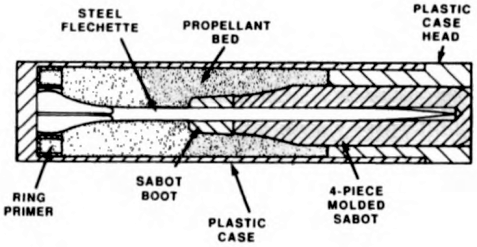
Steyr-Mannlicher ACR Cartridge

The Steyr ACR's rounds consist of a saboted carbon steel flechette packaged in a telescoped arrangement with propellant packed around the projectile. The case of the ammunition was a cylinder 45 mm long and 10.4 mm diameter made of a lightweight translucent plastic with a grooved aluminium ring at the rear end into which the priming mixture was pressed.

The flechette itself weighs 0.66 g and is approximately 1.6 mm diameter and 41.25 mm long with a roughened surface to ensure the sabot and flechette stay together during shot travel. The sabot is a four-part spindle sabot made of liquid crystal polymer held together with a plastic boot. The sum cartridge weight comes to 5.1g making the rounds less than half the weight of traditional brass-cased 5.56×45mm NATO ammunition.

== Performance ==
During testing the weapon performed well, and only two problems were identified. One was that the plastic cases had varying strengths, which has some effect on the ballistics. This was considered to be a fairly minor problem, one they expected could be solved through better materials and quality control. The other issue was somewhat more difficult to solve: when the sabots left the barrel they were still going quite fast, and presented a danger to other soldiers as well as to the shooter if they bounced off the ground when firing prone.

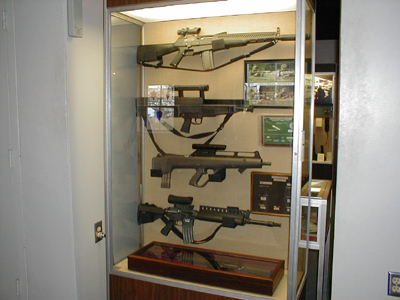
Rifles tested in ACR program, Steyr ACR third counting from top

=== Rifle ===
U.S. patent 4,739,570
U.S. patent 4,760,663
U.S. patent 4,817,496
U.S. patent 4,930,241
U.S. patent 4,944,109
U.S. patent 4,949,493

=== Ammunition ===
U.S. patent 4,846,068
U.S. patent 4,848,237
U.S. patent 4,928,597

== See also ==
- AAI ACR
- Colt ACR
- HK ACR
- Scicon IW
- Special Purpose Individual Weapon
- Steyr AMR 5075/Steyr IWS 2000, a prototype long range sniper rifle which fires similar but larger rounds
- Polymer-cased ammunition
- List of bullpup firearms
