= Benelli CB M2 =

- Type: Submachine gun
- Place of origin: Italy

Production history
- Designed: 1980s
- Manufacturer: Benelli

Specifications
- Mass: 3.40 kg
- Barrel length: 200 mm
- Cartridge: 9×25 mm AUPO
- Caliber: 9 mm
- Action: Blowback, open bolt ramrod
- Rate of fire: 800–1000
- Muzzle velocity: 390
- Feed system: 40-round detachable box magazine
- Sights: Fixed iron sights

The Benelli CB-M2 was an Italian simple blowback submachine gun resulting from a joint venture between Benelli and Fiocchi Munizioni.

== Overview ==
The weapon was chambered for the semi-caseless 9mm AUPO round. The AUPO bullet had an elongated, hollow base that acted as the case. The propellant filled the hollow space, and was sealed into the bullet with a fulminate plug. The AUPO round was "semi-caseless" because the hollow base of the bullet detached from the bullet itself after firing. However, it was not necessary to eject it from the side of the weapon as in a normal cartridge, because the base followed the bullet down the barrel and exited at the muzzle, in a similar fashion to a sabot. This simplified the action of the weapon, allowing it to move back and draw another round from the magazine, since there was no case to eject. With the omission of the ejector mechanism and the ejection step in the action, there were fewer moving parts to jam and cause unreliable functioning of the weapon. The weapon used an open bolt fired simple blowback operation that used instead of a bolt, a ramrod sealed with gas rings to chamber the round, with the hammer/firing pin striking the primer of the round sideways when chambered. The CB M2 never found any customers and the project was shelved.

== See also ==
- Lightweight Small Arms Technologies
- Caseless ammunition
- List of submachine guns
