= Special Purpose Individual Weapon =

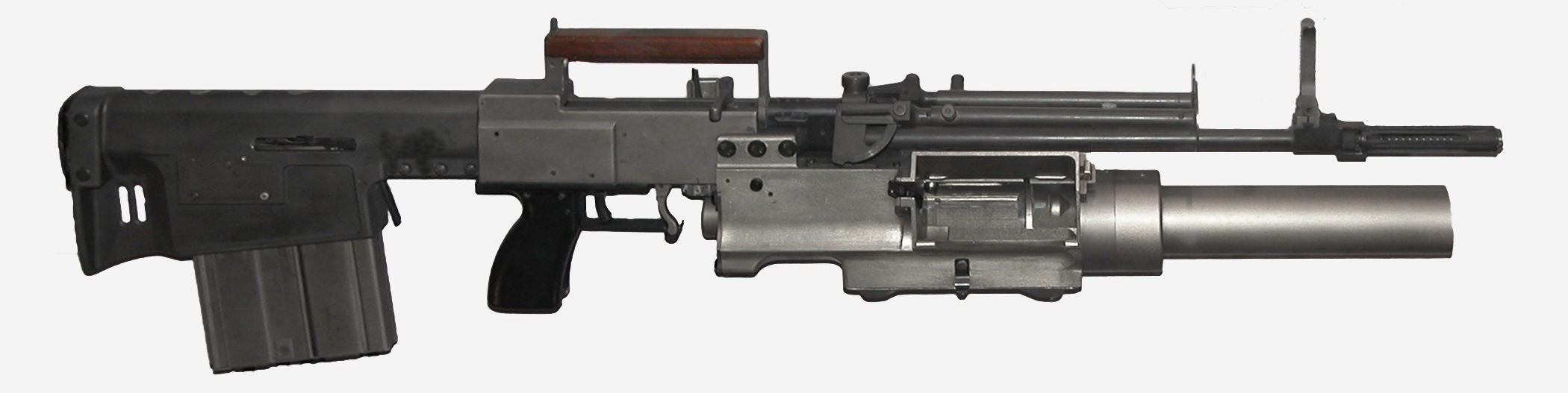
- The Special Purpose Individual Weapon at the museum of the Aberdeen Proving Ground in Aberdeen, Maryland, United States
- Type: Bullpup flechette rifle
- Place of origin: United States

Production history
- Designed: 1951

Specifications
- Mass: 3.5 lb (1.6 kg) (Project SALVO); 10 lb (4.5 kg); 24 lb (11 kg); 14 lb (6.4 kg) (Project NIBLICK)
- Cartridge: 12 gauge flechette rounds, XM110 5.6×53mm (Project SALVO)
- Rate of fire: 2300 rpm (Project SALVO); 2400 rpm (Project NIBLICK)
- Feed system: 60-round detachable box magazine (Project SALVO and NIBLICK)
- Sights: None

The Special Purpose Individual Weapon (SPIW) was a long-running United States Army program to develop, in part, a flechette-firing "rifle", though other concepts were also involved. The concepts continued to be tested under the Future Rifle Program and again in the 1980s under the Advanced Combat Rifle program, but neither program resulted in a system useful enough to warrant replacing the M16.

== Project SALVO ==
The idea of a flechette-firing individual weapon started in earnest during the Army's Project SALVO. SALVO had earlier concluded that a small weapon with a high rate of fire would be considerably deadlier than the large "full power" weapons being developed in the 1950s, and followed several lines of investigation to find the best way to provide high firing rates. SALVO had a small number of "duplex load" weapons developed, where two bullets were stacked, while Springfield Armory and Olin/Winchester both entered multiple barrel firearms.

Even before the SALVO tests, Irwin Barr of AAI Corporation had been developing single and multiple flechette cartridges. The Navy became sufficiently interested in the concept to provide him with some development funding from the Office of Naval Research, resulting in a 12 gauge shotgun shell firing 32 flechettes. The Army later added funding as well, and AAI was invited to SALVO. In SALVO testing they were found to be able to penetrate one side of a standard steel helmet at 500 yards (460 m)—excellent given their light weight—but the dispersion of the darts was so great as to make them only marginally useful.

Further development continued by adapting a Winchester Model 70 rifle with new XM110 5.6x53mm rounds firing a single dart. The result was a weapon with somewhat less accuracy than the .308Win (7.62×51mm NATO) rounds, but with equal penetration and a trajectory so flat it could be fired with no sight adjustment out to 400 yards (370 m). Better yet the rounds were very light, and had almost no recoil in comparison to even the .22-caliber weapons under development. This meant they could be fired at extremely high rates of fire, from a very lightweight weapon.

Project SALVO began in 1951 and was based on the assumption that firing multiple projectiles would increase the probability of hitting the target. Consideration to lighter ammunition types and rifle/grenade launcher combinations was given. Flechettes were found to be inaccurate and expelled fiberglass fragments with each round fired. SALVO mainly studied weapons and ammunition as opposed to developing them. It determined that higher velocity projectiles, smaller than .308 (7.62 mm), had equal or greater lethality with less weight. It also found that fully automatic fire did not increase hit probability.

Since the Army was by this time only interested in fully automatic weapons, Barr suggested that they build a multiple barrel prototype in order to quickly test the concept. Various multiple barrel rifles entered the project. The resulting "burst simulators" were tested in 1961, and the general conclusion was that the light weight of the flechette meant that it could be fired at extremely high rates of fire, the baseline being 2300 rpm, from a weapon of only 3.5 pounds (1.6 kilograms), fully loaded with 60 rounds. Accordingly, the Army became extremely interested in the weapon. The conclusion of Project SALVO was to adopt the Armalite AR-15, which became the M16 rifle.

== Project NIBLICK ==
Meanwhile, the Army's Operations Research Office, ORO, had been working on Project NIBLICK, follow-on to SALVO to develop a modern grenade launcher. Interested in the original shotgun-type shells, they recommended development of a dedicated flechette-firing weapon combined with a grenade launcher, the SPIW. The final requirements resulted in an over-under weapon, firing flechettes from one barrel, and grenades from the other. It was to weigh under 10 pounds (4.5 kilograms) fully loaded with three grenades and 60 flechettes.

Four companies responded to the contract tender: AAI, Springfield Armory, Winchester Arms and Harrington & Richardson. AAI continued with the original 5.6×53mm XM110 rounds (or sized in 0.22 by 2.09 inches), while Springfield and Winchester used a new 5.6×44mm (0.22 by 1.73 inches) XM144 cartridge. The H&R design loaded the dart from the XM144 into their own cartridge design.

The H&R design was the most advanced. It mounted the dart between three plastic sabots in a triangular plastic cartridge. When fired, the sabots were discarded early in small "sub-barrels" while the dart continued down the main barrel. Although the rounds were lightweight, the weapon itself was not, at 24 pounds (11 kilograms) while loaded, and the weapon was quickly eliminated from the contest.

Winchester's design used a "soft recoil" stock which absorbed the recoil of an individual round in a spring. The idea was to allow three rounds to be fired before the spring was completely compressed, meaning that there was very little recoil until the end of the burst. This was intended to dramatically increase the accuracy of burst fire, but the system never truly worked, and was later dropped. The grenade launcher portion of the design proved much more interesting, however, and work continued on that portion.

The Springfield entry was most interesting for its layout. It used two 30-round magazines in tandem in a bullpup layout, taking rounds from the front magazine first. However, their massive magazine-fed grenade launcher pushed the weight to 14 pounds (6.4 kilograms), and it seemed unlikely this could be reduced by much.

AAI's design was the least technically advanced. The flechette gun portion was somewhat heavy, but fired at 2400 rpm. Their grenade launcher was a simple single-shot weapon; their semi-automatic version was not ready in time for testing.

The conclusion of the testing was that none of the weapons were ready for development into a combat system. The AAI flechette portion and the Winchester grenade launcher were both interesting for general development, however. More worrying was the result of general testing of the flechette concept. While the weapons delivered on their promise of extremely high rates of fire and excellent penetration, the rounds themselves were extremely expensive to produce, and the darts could be easily deflected in flight even by heavy rain. Finally, the rounds gave off extremely loud reports and had a huge muzzle flash, making the guns easily visible in low light.

A second round of testing followed, with the Springfield model adopting the Winchester grenade launcher with a disposable magazine and a new side-by-side layout for the flechette magazines. AAI's design was equipped with their semi-automatic launcher, which was now complete, and a new plastic buttstock/sighting system. Neither updated version proved very reliable and both were over the 10 pounds (4.5 kilograms) limit. In 1966 SPIW was put into "maintenance mode" and the M16 adopted.

AAI continued development at a low level, and eventually managed to dramatically improve the reliability of their XM19. However, this revealed another problem: heat buildup in the chamber was great enough to result in "cook off". Changes in the Army command structure and the adoption of the M16 made interest in the SPIW fade, and eventually the project was allowed to die. AAI's original "simple" grenade launcher turned out to be a major success: it was selected as the M203 in 1968 and became a common weapon under the M16.

== The Future Rifle Program ==
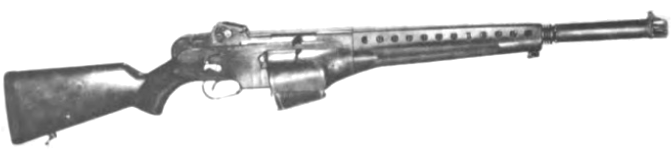
1969 AAI SPIW

In 1969, the Army started the Future Rifle Program, and invited AAI to enter against General Electric's Dual Cycle Rifle, a derivative of the Springfield SALVO design. (Springfield had closed in 1968.) Additional entries with multiple flechettes or bullets ("micro-caliber") were also entered, mirroring the original SALVO tests of the 1950s. However, the program came under attack by the United States Congress as a waste of money, and was forced to scale back. Testing finally began in 1974. The AAI design never managed to fire more than six bursts before jamming. A possible entrant was the French designed VFIW assault rifle.

== Advanced Combat Rifle (ACR) ==
The concept of firing flechette ammunition was revived for the last time during the 1986 Advanced Combat Rifle (ACR) trials in the late 1980s. Several designs were entered, from the simple Colt ACR to the more exotic flechette designs, such as the Steyr ACR. Although the basic problem of a single-dart flechette round had finally been solved by this time, none of the weapons entered offered the 100% improvement over the M16 that the Army tests required.

It was based on the assumption that accuracy errors made by stressed soldiers could be made up for by launching multiple rounds per trigger pull. The conclusion of the ACR program was that even firing multiple projectiles could not substantially compensate for shooter error.

== See also ==
- Attached grenade launchers
- Lightweight Small Arms Technologies
- List of bullpup firearms
- NIVA XM1970
- Objective Individual Combat Weapon program
