= Michael J. Conrad =

United States Army general (1933–2023)

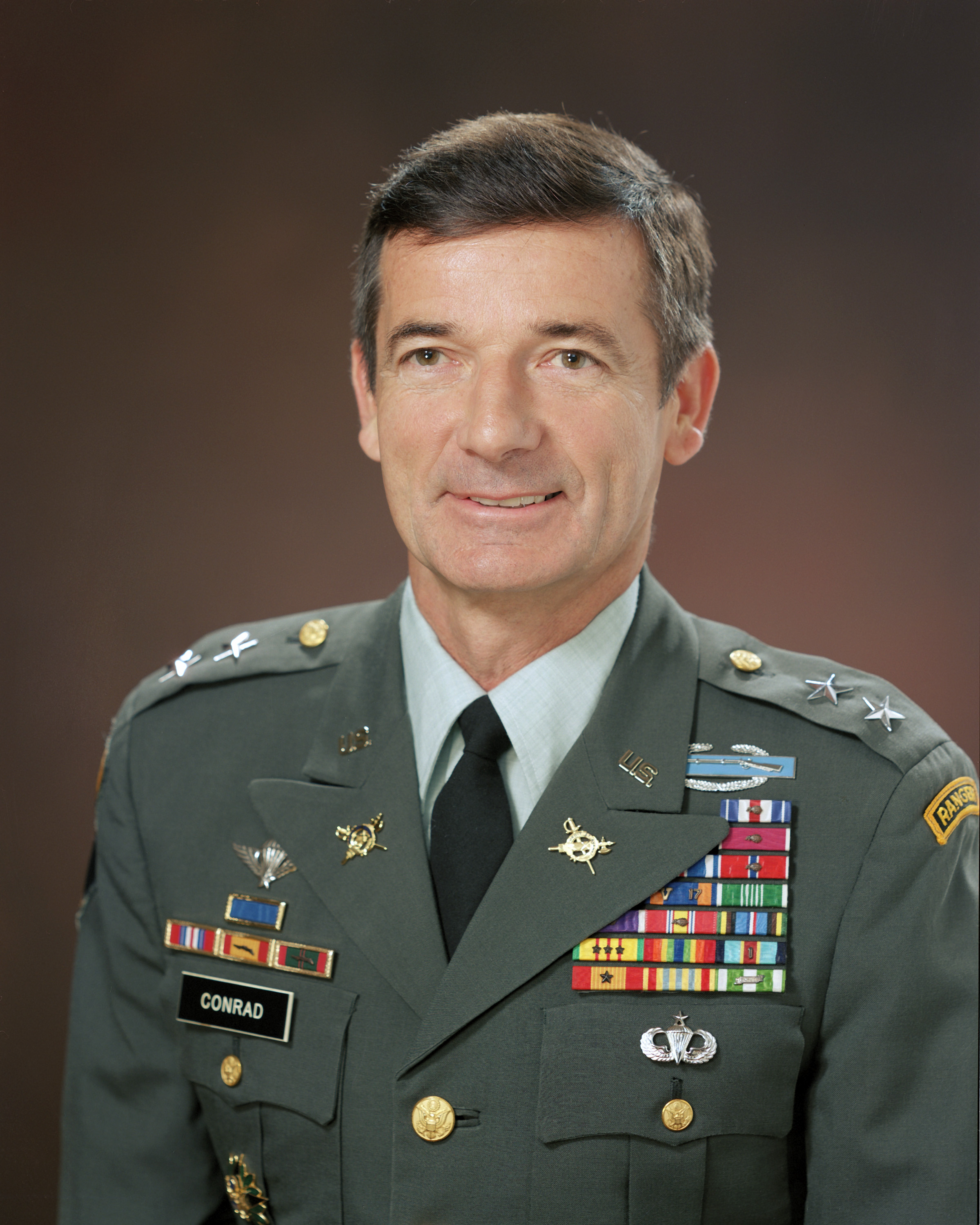
- Born: July 29, 1933; Dayton, Ohio, U.S.
- Died: January 6, 2023 (aged 89); Carmichael, California, U.S.
- Burial place: Arlington National Cemetery
- Military career
- Allegiance: United States of America
- Branch: United States Army
- Service years: 1956–1988
- Rank: Major General
- Commands: 1st Cavalry Division; 2nd Brigade, 9th Infantry Division; 2nd Battalion, 8th Cavalry Regiment
- Conflicts: Vietnam War
- Awards: Distinguished Service Medal (U.S. Army); Silver Star Medal (2); Legion of Merit (2); Distinguished Flying Cross; Bronze Star Medal (2); Air Medal (17); Army Commendation Medal; Purple Heart (2)

Michael John Conrad (July 29, 1933 – January 6, 2023) was a United States Army major general who served as Commanding General, 1st Cavalry Division from 1984 to 1986 and then as Deputy Inspector General of the Army until his retirement in 1988. He graduated from the United States Military Academy with a B.S. degree in military science in 1956. Conrad later earned an M.S. degree in mathematics from the Rensselaer Polytechnic Institute in 1965.

Conrad served as a battalion commander in Vietnam from 1969 to 1970 and was awarded two Silver Star Medals, the Distinguished Flying Cross, two Bronze Star Medals, seventeen Air Medals and two Purple Hearts. He has also received the Distinguished Service Medal, two awards of the Legion of Merit and an Army Commendation Medal.

Conrad died in Carmichael, California on January 6, 2023, at the age of 89.
