= Polymer-cased ammunition =

Type of lighter firearm cartridge

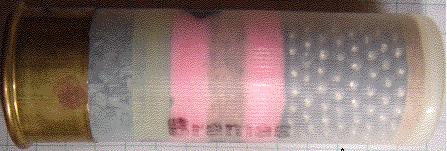
A 12-gauge shotgun shell in a transparent plastic hull, allowing the contents to be seen.

Polymer-cased ammunition (PCA) is firearm ammunition (cartridge) with casings made from synthetic polymer instead of the typical metallic casing. PCA is commonly seen among shotgun shells, and is considered a new alternative for long guns and handguns that potentially reduces ammunition production cost and weight.

== Origin ==
The first references to the possible use of polymers in the manufacture of casings come from the early 1950s. One of the earliest is the patent filed by Jack W. Roske in 1950 and the idea was to use a metal cup joined with a polymer shell "that will be converted to gas during the firing phase to assist in propelling the projectile and thereby permit reduction in the use of the propelling powder charge".

== Examples ==
- The majority of commonly found shotgun shell hulls are constructed of polymer with metal only found on the lower or rim portions of the shells.
- The Steyr ACR was a notable user of polymer cased ammunition.
- The US Army ARDEC developed a 5.56mm Telescoped ammunition for its LSAT program.
- The Assistant Secretary of Defense for Special Operation's TSWG program developed lightweight cartridges in multiple calibers for USSOCOM.
- Textron Systems: Textron CT System carbine, rifle, automatic rifle utilizing a Olin Winchester CT 5.56, 6.5, 6.8 and 7.62 mm polymer cased-telescoped cartridge.
- Desert Tech MDR rifle with PCP Ammunition 6.8mm polymer case-metal cartridge.
- Knight's Armament Company LAMG machine gun with PCP Ammunition 6.8mm polymer case-metal cartridge and .277 True Velocity polymer ammunition.
- True Velocity (earlier LoneStar Future Weapons, General Dynamics): RM-277R bullpup rifle and RM-277AR machine gun utilizing True Velocity .277 TVCM polymer cased cartridge.
- KAC M110 SASS sniper rifle utilizing True Velocity 7.62 and .277 TVCM polymer cased cartridge.
- M240 machine gun utilizing True Velocity 7.62 and .277 TVCM polymer cased cartridge.
- M134 Minigun utilizing True Velocity 7.62 and .277 TVCM polymer cased cartridge.
- Lightweight Medium Machine Gun utilizing True Velocity .338 Norma Mag polymer cased cartridge.

== Manufacturers ==
- PCP Tactical offers a variety of calibers in 5.56mm NATO/.223 Rem, 7.62mm NATO/.308 Win, .260 Rem, 6.5mm Creedmoor, 6.8mm PCP and .50 BMG.
- PolyCase Ammunition offered a .380 Polymer Cased Round.
- True Velocity offers polymer ammunition in a variety of calibers including 5.56 NATO, 6.5mm Creedmoor, 6.8mm TVCM, .308 Win/7.62mm NATO, .338 Norma Mag and .50 BMG.

== See also ==
- Caseless ammunition
