= Flechette =

Pointed, fin-stabilized steel projectile

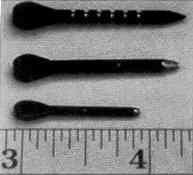
Examples of various small-arms flechettes (scale in inches)

A flechette or fléchette (/fleɪˈʃɛt/ flay-SHET) is a pointed, fin-stabilized steel projectile. The name comes from French fléchette (from flèche), meaning "little arrow" or "dart". They have been used as ballistic weapons since World War I. Delivery systems and methods of launching flechettes vary, from a single shot to thousands in a single explosive round. The use of flechettes as antipersonnel weapons has been controversial; however, in war, it is not prohibited by the Hague Convention.

== Air-dropped ==
The weapons were designed to be dropped from an aircraft. They contained no explosive charge but as they fell they developed significant kinetic energy making them lethal and able to easily penetrate soft cover such as jungle canopy, several inches of sand or light armor.

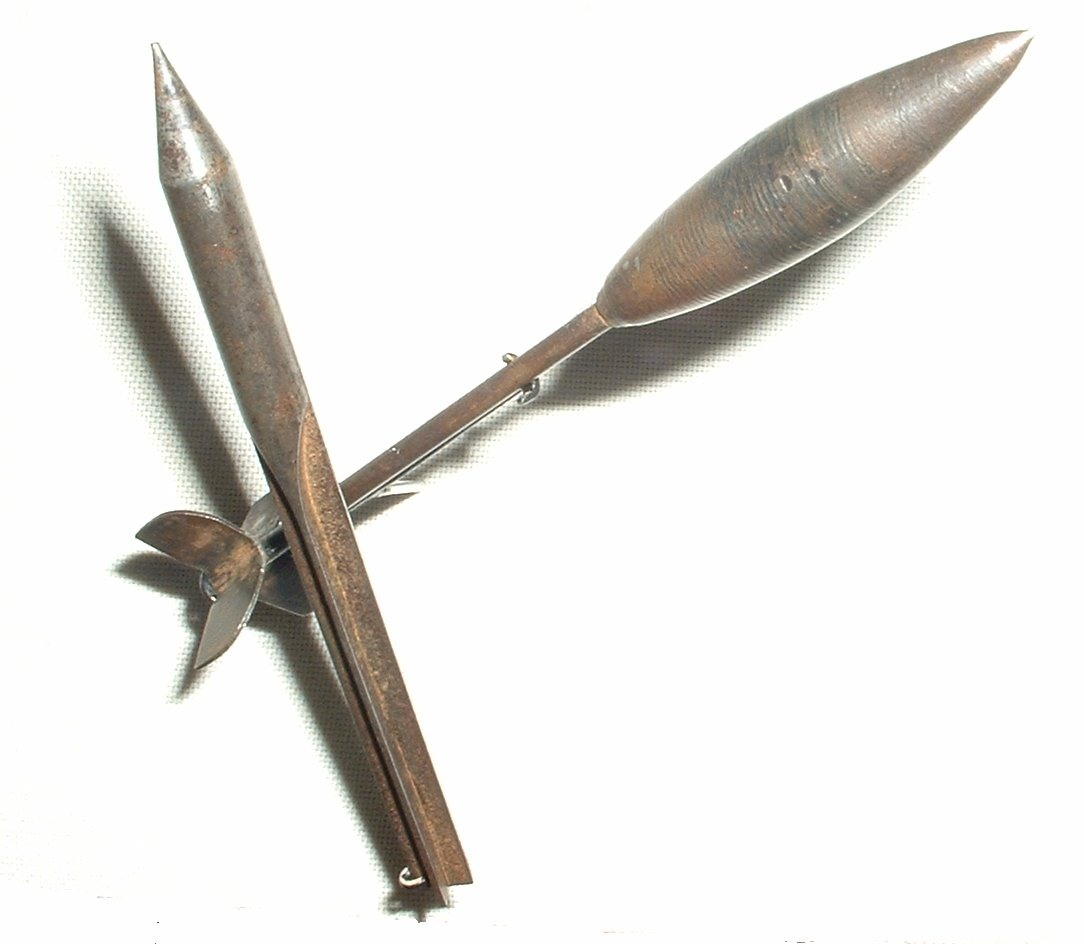
World War I air dropped flechettes, most likely French

During World War I, flechettes were dropped from aircraft to attack infantry and were able to pierce helmets.

Also during World War II, a version of the flechette with feathers was used.

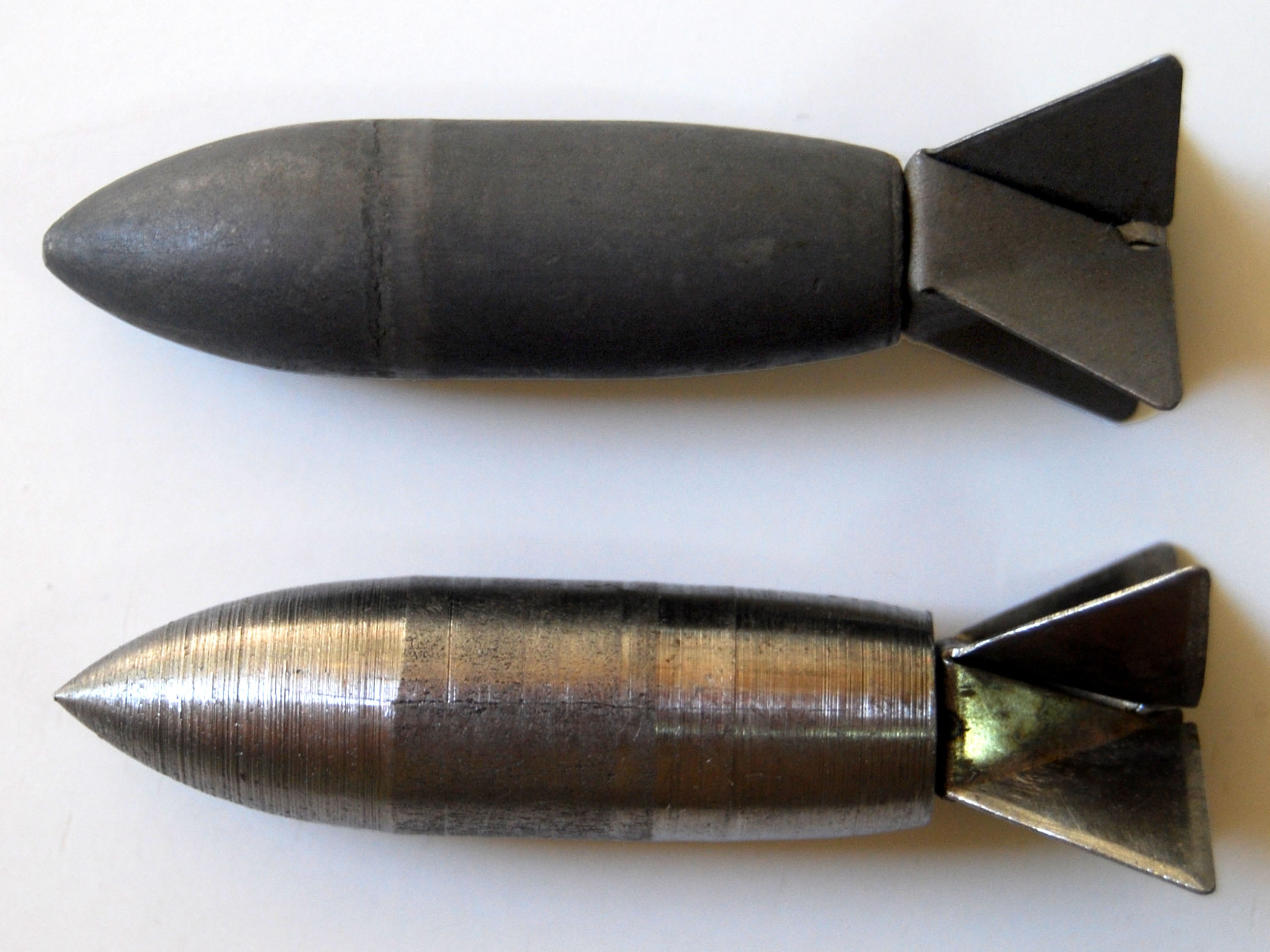
Two designs of the Lazy Dog bomb. (Top: early forged steel design; Bottom: later lathe-turned steel design)

Later the U.S. used Lazy Dog bombs, which are small, unguided kinetic projectiles typically about 1.75 in (44 mm) in length, 0.5 in (13 mm) in diameter, and weighing about 0.7 oz (20 g). Lazy Dog munitions were simple and cheap; they could be dropped in huge numbers in a pass. Though their immediate effects were often no less indiscriminate than other projectiles, they did not leave unexploded ordnance (UXO) that could be active years after a conflict ended. Lazy Dog projectiles were used primarily during the Korean and Vietnam Wars.

== Small-arms ammunition ==
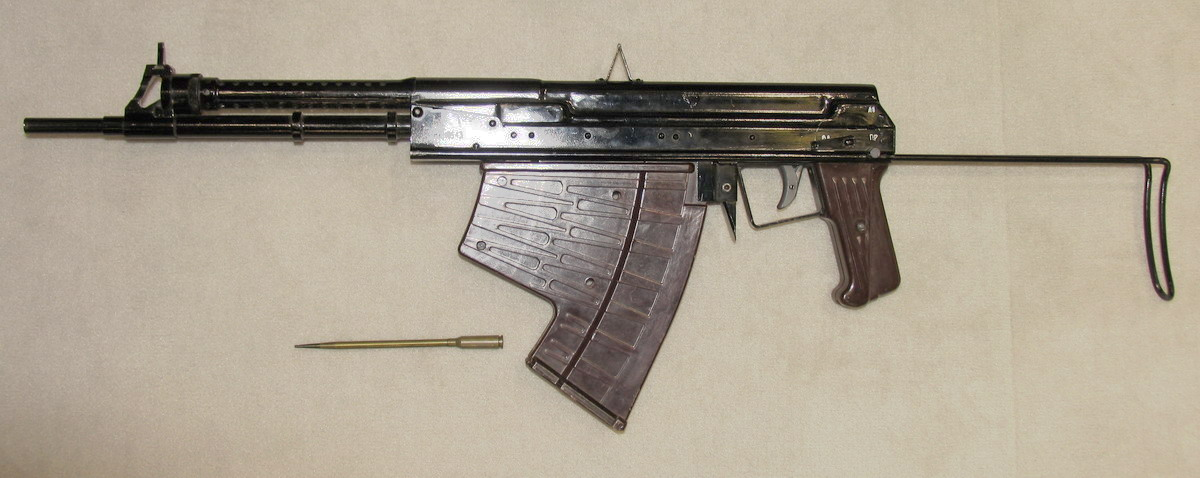
APS amphibious rifle

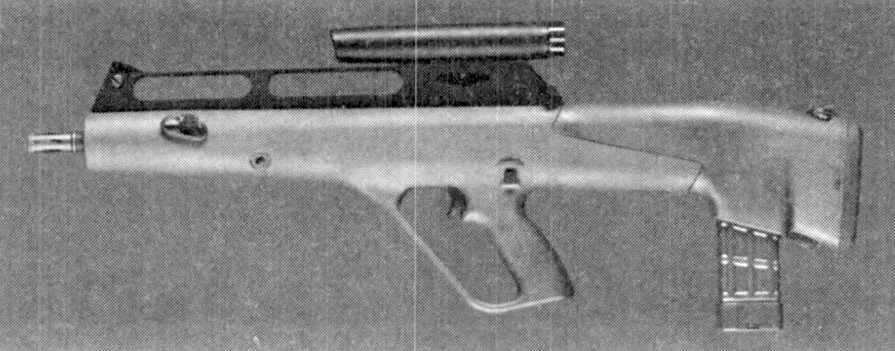
Steyr-Mannlicher ACR rifle

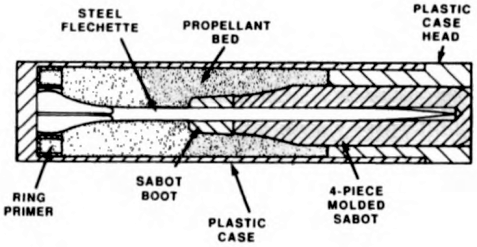
Steyr-Mannlicher ACR flechette cartridge

The excellent ballistic performance and armor-piercing potential of flechettes have made the development and integration of this class of munition attractive to small-arms manufacturers. A number of attempts have been made to field flechette-firing small arms.

Work at Johns Hopkins University in the 1950s led to the development of the direct injection antipersonnel chemical biological agent (DIACBA), where flechettes were grooved, hollow pointed, or otherwise milled to retain a quantity of chemical or biological warfare agent to be delivered through a ballistic wound. The initial work was with the nerve agent VX, which had to be thickened to deliver a reliable dose. Eventually this was replaced by a highly toxic carbamate insecticide. The US Biological Program also had a microflechette to deliver either botulinum toxin A or saxitoxin, the M1 biodart, which resembled a 7.62 mm rifle cartridge. The USSR had the AO-27 rifle as well as the APS amphibious rifle, and other countries have their own flechette rounds.

A number of prototype flechette-firing weapons were developed as part of the long-running Special Purpose Individual Weapon (SPIW) project. The Steyr-Mannlicher ACR rifle was a prototype flechette-firing assault rifle built for the US Army's Advanced Combat Rifle program of 1989–90.

A variation of the flechette addressing its difficulties is the SCMITR, developed as part of the Close Assault Weapon System, or CAWS, project. Selective-fire shotguns were used to fire flechettes designed to retain the exterior ballistics and penetration of standard flechettes, but increase wounding capacity through a wider wound path.

=== Shotguns ===
During the Vietnam War the United States employed 12-gauge combat shotguns using flechette loads. These plastic-cased shells were issued on a limited trial basis. Cartridges manufactured by the Western Cartridge Company contained 20 flechettes, each 18.5 mm (0.73 in) long and weighing 7.3 gr (0.47 g); Federal Cartridge Company rounds contained 25. The flechettes were packed in a plastic cup with granulated white polyethylene to maintain alignment with the bore axis, and supported by a metal disk to prevent penetration of the over-powder wad during acceleration down the bore. The tips of the flechettes were exposed in the Federal cartridges, but concealed by a conventional star crimp in WCC's cartridges. The flechettes demonstrated flatter trajectories over longer ranges than spherical buckshot, but combat effectiveness did not justify continued production.

== Rocket and artillery use ==
Smaller flechettes were used in special artillery shells called "beehive" rounds (so named after the very distinctive whistling buzz made by thousands of flechettes flying downrange at supersonic speeds) and intended for use against troops in the open – a ballistic shell packed with flechettes was fired and set off by a mechanical time fuse, scattering flechettes in an expanding cone.

During the Vietnam War 105 mm howitzer batteries and tanks (90 mm guns) used flechette rounds to defend themselves against massed infantry attacks. The ubiquitous 105 mm M40 recoilless rifle was primarily used as an anti-tank weapon. However, it could also be used in an anti-personnel role with the use of flechette rounds. The widely used Carl Gustaf 8.4 cm recoilless rifle also uses an Area Defence Munition designed as a close-range anti-personnel round. It fires 1,100 flechettes over a wide area. The US Air Force used 2.75 in (70 mm) rockets with WDU-4/A flechette warheads.

The 70 mm Hydra 70 rocket currently in service with the US Armed forces can be fitted with an anti-personnel (APERS) warhead containing 1,179 flechettes. They are carried by attack helicopters such as the AH-64 Apache and the AH-1 Cobra.

=== Israel-Palestine conflict ===
Israeli authorities have reportedly used flechettes in Gaza since at least 2001. That year, Israeli officials stated that "The Israeli military obtained these weapons from the USA after the 1973 war and we have thousands of old shells in warehouses." B'Tselem documented nine Palestinians including four children who were killed by the IDF using flechettes between 2001 and 2003. In April 2003 Israel High Court rejected a petition to ban flechettes. A 2009 fact finding mission of amnesty found two persons killed by flechettes and some more wounded. In the Goldstone Report, the UN also investigated Israel's use of flechettes, describing this ammunition as unsuitable for use in residential areas, but concluding that Israel's usage was not proscribed by international law. The Israeli High Court of Justice has rejected the argument that flechette munitions are by their nature indiscriminate and maintains that subject to the general requirements of the rules of armed conflict their use is legal.

=== Russo-Ukrainian war ===
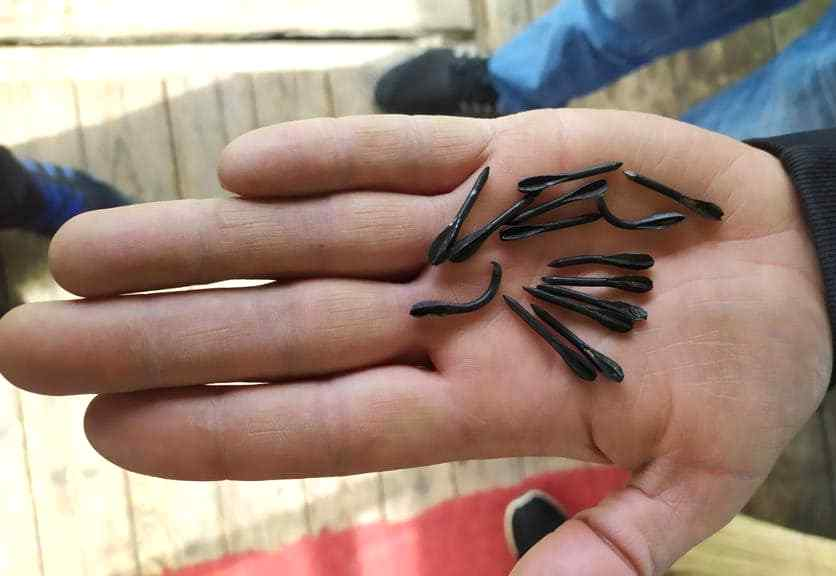
Flechettes found in Sumy Oblast after Russian shelling on 30 May 2022

Flechettes have been used during the Russian invasion of Ukraine, where samples of the projectiles were recovered in the mass graves in Bucha, Ukraine. A witness described munitions bursting overhead and littering the area with 3 cm flechettes. A British munitions expert reviewed photographs of the flechettes and concluded that they likely came from a 3Ш1 (flèchette) 122 mm artillery round. A speaker for the Ukrainian Ground Forces stated that Ukraine's military does not use shells with flechettes.

== See also ==
- Kinetic energy penetrator
- Armour-piercing fin-stabilized discarding sabot

== Bibliography ==
- Eades, J. B.; Powers, C. (1964). Static and Dynamic Stability Studies on Several Lazy Dog Configurations. Naval Ordnance Laboratory. DTIC AD0352807.
- Karmes, David (2014), The Patricia Lynn Project: Vietnam War, the Early Years of Air Intelligence, iUniverse, ISBN 978-1-4917-5227-2
- Pursglove, S. David (February 1962). "Bizarre Weapons for the Little Wars". Popular Mechanics. 117 (2). Hearst Magazines: 107–112. ISSN 0032-4558.
