= Advanced Combat Rifle =

1986–1990 US Army program

The Advanced Combat Rifle (ACR) was a United States Army program, started in 1986, to find a replacement for the M16 assault rifle. Under the stress of battle the average soldier with an M16 may shoot a target at 45 meters, but hit probability is reduced to one out of ten shots on target by 220 meters. Because of this, the ACR program was initiated in the late 1980s to create a weapon that could double the hit probability. None of the weapons tested met the criteria, and the program ended in 1990 after an expenditure of approximately US$300 million. The ACR program was preceded by older programs such as the Special Purpose Individual Weapon.

== Phase I and II ==
Phase I of the program started in February 1986 when development contracts were placed with six companies: AAI Corporation, Ares Incorporated, Colt's Manufacturing Company, Heckler & Koch (H&K), McDonnell Douglas Helicopter Systems (MDHS), and Steyr Mannlicher.

Two weapons were cut from the list before Phase II started. The companies started an appeals process and were eventually re-instated, but too late to see testing before the ACR program ended.

Eugene Stoner’s Ares Incorporated also entered their Advanced Individual Weapon System (AIWS), which used a 5mm tracer round, but had to withdraw due to ongoing problems. The AIWS shared some features with the Steyr entry, notably the "rising chamber" action and "telescoped" cartridge.

McDonnell Douglas Helicopter Systems, originally Hughes Helicopters, planned to enter their design using a plastic-cased cartridge they called a chiclet due to its box-like profile. Their first loads used duplex or triplex loads of normal projectiles, but the recoil was too high, so these were replaced with flechettes, first with five of them in a 11-millimetre (.42 in) round, eventually three in an 8.6-millimetre (.338 in) round.

== Phase III ==
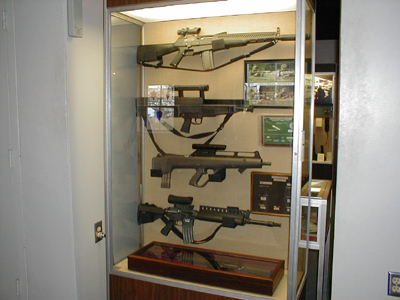
From top to bottom, ACR test rifles from AAI, HK, Steyr, and Colt

Phase III began in August 1989, when AAI, Colt, HK, and Steyr entered weapon testing.

=== AAI ===
AAI Corporation entered the latest variant of their long line of experimental fléchette rifles. Their entry used a standard 5.56×45mm NATO cartridge case firing a 1.6×41.27mm fléchette of 0.66 grams at 1402 m/s. One of the biggest complaints about their earlier efforts was the loud muzzle blast, a problem that is hard to avoid with a sabotted round. As a result, AAI added a flash hider/sound suppressor that reduced the muzzle blast to just louder than an M16A2. While the standard 5.56×45mm case was used, the rifle was not safe to fire using standard ammunition due to the design of the gas system. A special magazine was used to prevent soldiers loading standard 5.56×45mm NATO ammunition into the magazine, but rounds could still be chambered by hand. The weapon was limited to three-round bursts despite the fact that one of the main reasons for using a fléchette is its low recoil. This particular design was less complex than some of their earlier models, which could switch between fléchette ammunition for rapid fire and standard 5.56 NATO rounds for long-range semi-automatic fire.

=== H&K ===
The Heckler & Koch G11 series used caseless ammunition where the propellant was molded onto the bullet itself, making the round smaller and much lighter. The new K2 version used in the ACR tests held 45 rounds in a single long magazine lying along the top of the barrel, leading to a distinctive and somewhat blocky appearance.

=== Steyr ===
The last entry submitted was the Steyr ACR, another fléchette-firing weapon. The Steyr differed from the AAI in the details of the round, which used a plastic shell casing to reduce weight. The firing mechanism was quite complex as a result, moving the entire chamber as opposed to just the bolt. When fired, the chamber would move down where a new round would be pushed in from the rear, forcing the spent cartridge case forward out of the chamber where it would drop out through an ejection port behind the pistol grip. The chamber would then move back into firing position on a spring, where it would lock in front of a fixed breechblock. On firing, the sabot traveled down the barrel with the fléchette and was quickly "stripped" off upon exit. This was found to present a hazard in combat, where the sabots could hit other soldiers or bounce off the ground when being fired prone. Like the AAI weapon, the Steyr was limited to three round bursts.

=== Colt ===
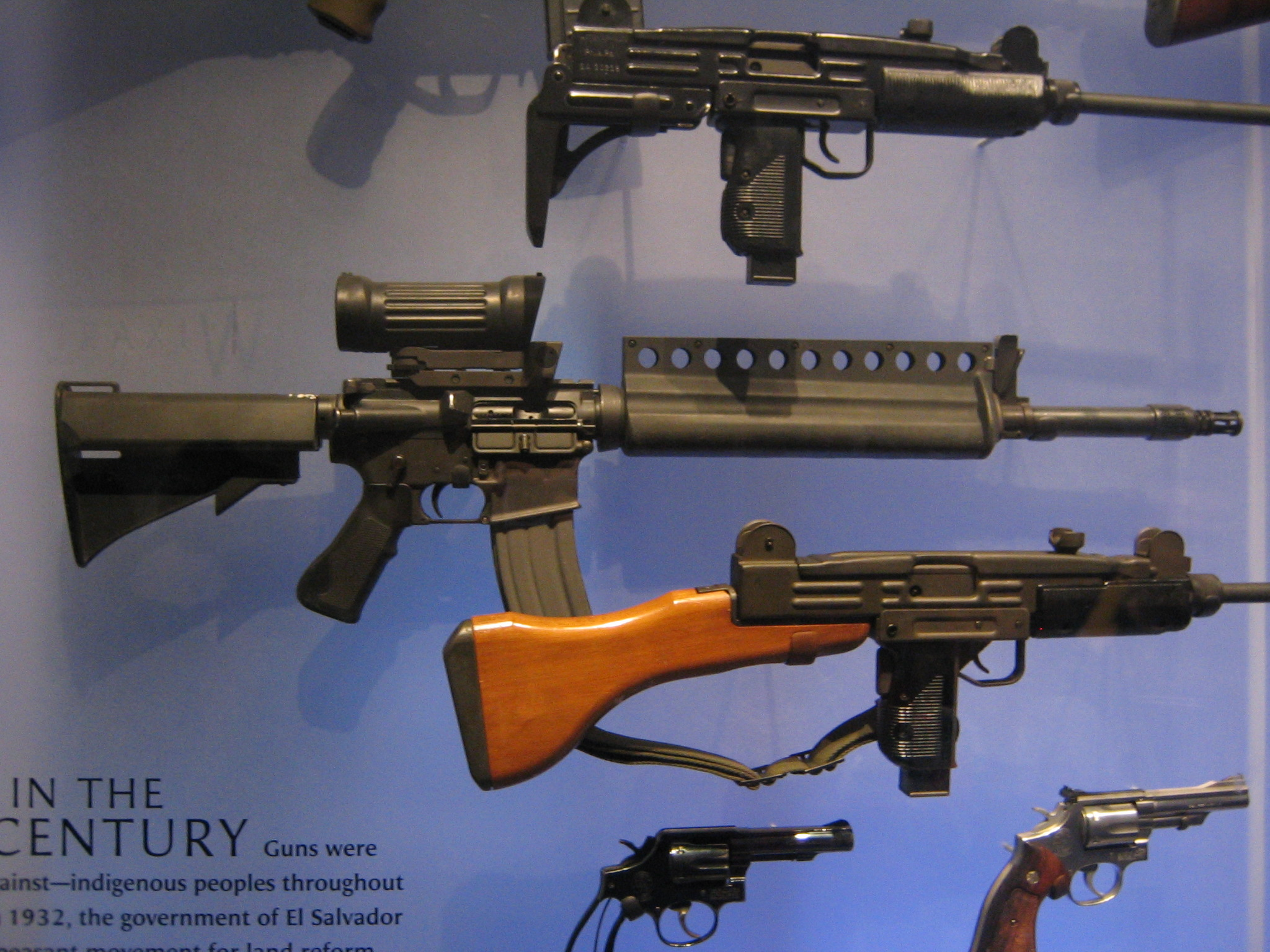
Colt ACR/M16A2E2

One of the more traditional of the ACR prototypes was the Colt ACR, which was a highly modified version of the existing M16A2. Modifications were the addition of a new optical sighting system, a hydraulic buffer to smooth out recoil during automatic fire, and a collapsing butt stock similar to the one already in use on the carbine versions of the M16. The key design change was the use of "duplex rounds", a single cartridge with two smaller bullets in it. Olin Corporation produced three different rounds for testing, the first consisting of two tungsten projectiles in a long-necked case, the second used a standard-length case with two 1.7 grams (27 gr), 4.0-millimetre (0.158 in) tungsten projectiles, and the final entry was another standard-length case with two 5.7-millimetre (0.224 in) projectiles, one 2.3 grams (35 gr), the other 2.1 g (33 gr). The latter was eventually selected for submission to the ACR trials. The basic idea of the duplex load is to increase the number of projectiles fired, which is the primary determinant of battlefield casualties. However, they significantly reduced accuracy, requiring the user to also carry traditional ammunition for long-range shots.

== Outcome ==
Although all the designs worked well, none managed to meet or even approach the 100% improvement over the M16A2 that the program demanded. In 1986/7, the United States Army Infantry School had published a report asserting that the rifle, as a weapon, had already reached its peak, and the only way to really improve matters was to use an exploding warhead. This led to the ending of the ACR program in April 1990, and led the way to the Objective Individual Combat Weapon program. The program's total cost was approximately US$300 million.

== See also ==
- Project Abakan — Similar program to the ACR
- List of individual weapons of the U.S. Armed Forces
- Polymer-cased ammunition
- XM8
