= Damage (disambiguation) =

Damage is any change to a thing that degrades it from its original state.

Damage may also refer to:

== General concepts ==
- Collateral damage, unintended damage caused during a military operation
- Fire damage
- Foreign object damage, damage to a vehicle or system caused by any foreign substance, debris, or article
- Hydrogen damage, metal degradation processes due to interaction with hydrogen
- Property damage, damage to public or private property
- Radiation damage, damage or injury due to ionizing radiation
- Water damage, damage done by water to materials not resistant to the effect of water
- Damage mechanics, damage to materials due to cyclic mechanical loads
- Biology and medical:
  - Any form of injury
  - Articular cartilage damage
  - Brain damage
  - Cell damage, to a biological cell
  - Nerve damage
  - Somatic damage (disambiguation)

== Law ==
- Damages, a sum of money awarded by a court of law
- Institutional damage, unintended consequences to an individual resulting from interaction with an institution

== Arts and entertainment ==
=== Film and television ===
- Damage (1992 film), a French romantic drama by Louis Malle
- Damage (2009 film), an American action film by Jeff King, starring Stone Cold Steve Austin
- Damage (2016 film), a Ugandan drama film by Dhikusooka Denis Jr.
- Damage (2020 film), an Australian drama film by Madeleine Blackwell
- "Damage" (Angel), a 2004 episode of Angel
- "Damage" (Star Trek: Enterprise), a 2004 episode of Star Trek: Enterprise
- "Damage" (Supergirl), a 2017 episode of Supergirl

=== Gaming ===
- The general loss of a character or enemy's health, caused by an attack or injury
- Damage Incorporated, a 1998 computer game for Mac and Windows by Paranoid Productions
- Damage over time, a game design concept
- Quad damage, a power-up in the first-person shooter computer game series Quake
- Splash damage, damage taken by players or objects in the area surrounding a point of weapon impact
- Splash Damage, British computer game developer

=== Literature ===
- Damage (DC Comics), a comic book character from DC Comics
- Damage (Hart novel), a 1991 novel by Josephine Hart
- Damage (Jenkins novel), a 2001 young adult novel by A. M. Jenkins
- Damage (Marvel Comics), a comic book character from Marvel Comics
- Damage, a fictional card game in the 1987 Iain M. Banks novel Consider Phlebas

=== Music ===
- Damage (American band), a 1980s New York hardcore punk band
- Damage (British group), an R&B group from the 1990s
- DJ Damage, Australian hip hop DJ and turntablist
- Damage, the original name of Swedish metal band Morgana Lefay

==== Albums ====
- Damage (Blues Explosion album) or the title song, 2004
- Damage (Jimmy Eat World album) or the title song (see below), 2013
- Damage (Kosheen album) or the title song, 2007
- Damage: Live or the title song, by David Sylvian and Robert Fripp, 1994/2001
- The Damage, by Ludus, 2002

==== Songs ====
- "Damage" (H.E.R. song), 2020
- "Damage" (Jimmy Eat World song), 2013
- "Damage" (Mýa song), 2018
- "Damage" (Pharoahe Monch song), 2012
- "Damage" (You Am I song), 2000
- "The Damage" (song), by Marillion, 2004
- "Damage", by Chris Brown from Exclusive, 2007
- "Damage", by the Cooper Temple Clause from Make This Your Own, 2007
- "Damage", by Exo from Don't Mess Up My Tempo, 2018
- "Damage", by Fit for Rivals, 2009
- "Damage", by Just B from Just Burn, 2021
- "Damage", by Lights from A6, 2024
- "Damage", by Myka Relocate from The Young Souls, 2015
- "Damage", by Namie Amuro, 2012
- "Damage", by PartyNextDoor from Seven Days, 2017
- "Damage", by Tiefschwarz, 2006
- "Damage", by Yo La Tengo from I Can Hear the Heart Beating as One, 1997

== People ==
- Damage, a persona used by American wrestler Rodney Begnaud (born 1970), best known as Rodney Mack

== See also ==
- Damages (disambiguation)
- Damaged (disambiguation)
- Damage Control (disambiguation)
- Damage Done (disambiguation)
- Damageplan, American heavy metal band
- Damaging quotation, a short utterance by a public figure used by opponents as a discrediting tactic
- Break (disambiguation)
- Corrosion
- Degradation (disambiguation)
- Destroy (disambiguation)
- Dam (disambiguation)
