= Damaged (disambiguation) =

Damage is any change in a thing, often a physical object, that degrades it away from its initial state.

Damaged may also refer to:

== Film and television ==
- Damaged (film), a 2024 crime thriller
- Damaged (TV series), an Indian streaming television series
- Damaged (web series), 2013 animated web series
- "Damaged" (After You've Gone), a 2008 television episode
- "Damaged" (Arrow), 2012 television episode
- "Damaged" (Band of Gold), a 1995 television episode

== Music ==
- Damaged (band), an Australian deathgrind band
- Damaged (Black Flag album), 1981
- Damaged (Course of Nature album), 2008
- Damaged (Lambchop album), 2006
- Damaged (EP), a 2007 split EP by Boris and Stupid Babies Go Mad
- "Damaged" (Danity Kane song), 2008
- "Damaged" (TLC song), 2003
- "Damaged", a 1991 song by Primal Scream from Screamadelica

== See also ==
- Damage (disambiguation)
