= Lazy Dog =

Lazy Dog may refer to:

- Lazy Dog (night club), a popular night club at Notting Hill Arts Club in west London
- Lazy Dog (bomb), a cluster bomb used in World War II and in the Vietnam War
- Lazy Dog Restaurant & Bar, an American casual dining restaurant chain

== See also ==
- The quick brown fox jumps over the lazy dog
