= Destruction =

Destruction may refer to:

== Concepts ==
- Destruktion, a term from the philosophy of Martin Heidegger
- Destructive narcissism, a pathological form of narcissism
- Self-destructive behaviour, a widely used phrase that conceptualises certain kinds of destructive acts as belonging to the self
- Slighting, the deliberate destruction of a building
- Final destruction, the end of the world

== Comics and gaming ==
- Destruction (DC Comics), one of the Endless in Neil Gaiman's comic book series The Sandman
- Destructoid, a video-game blog

== Music ==
- Destruction (band), a German thrash metal band
- Destruction (EP), a 1994 EP by Destruction
- "Destruction" (song), a 2015 song by Joywave
- "Destruction", a 1984 song by Loverboy featured in Giorgio Moroder's restoration of the film Metropolis
- "The Destruction", a song from the 1988 musical Carrie

== Television and film ==
- "Destruction" (UFO), a 1970 episode of UFO
- Destruction (film), a 1915 film starring Theda Bara

== Other uses ==
- Destruction Bay, Yukon, Canada
- NJPW Destruction, professional wrestling event

== See also ==
- Destroyed (disambiguation)
- Destroy (disambiguation)
- Damage (disambiguation)
