= Grapeshot =

Type of ammunition consisting of multiple small balls

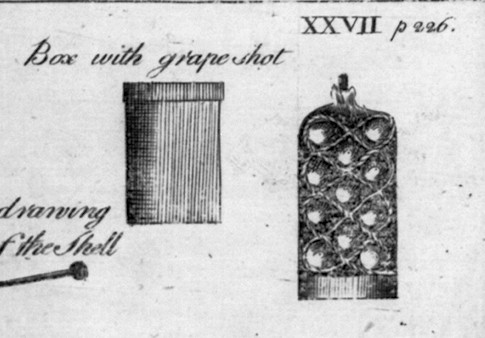
Close-up of grapeshot (right) from an American Revolution sketch of artillery devices

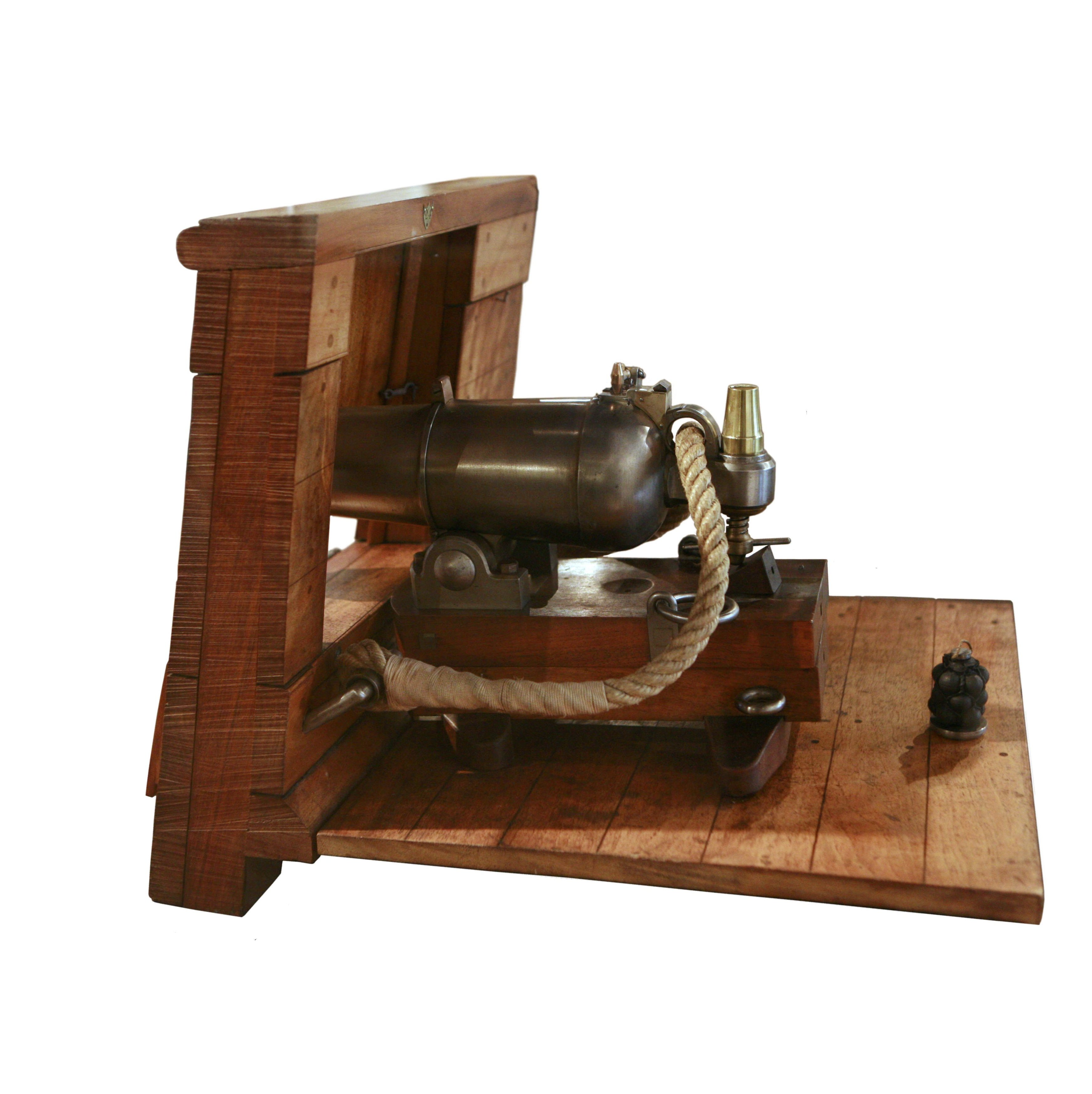
Model of a carronade with grapeshot ammunition

In artillery, a grapeshot is a type of ammunition that consists of a collection of smaller-caliber round shots packed tightly in a canvas bag and separated from the gunpowder charge by a metal wadding, rather than being a single solid projectile. When assembled, the shot resembled a cluster of grapes, hence the name. Grapeshot was used both on land and at sea. On firing, the canvas wrapping disintegrates and the contained balls scatter out from the muzzle, giving a ballistic effect similar to a giant shotgun.

Grapeshot was devastatingly effective against massed infantry at short range and was also used at medium range. Solid shot was used at longer range and canister at shorter. When used in naval warfare, grapeshot served a dual purpose. First, it continued its role as an anti-personnel projectile. However, the effect was diminished due to a large portion of the crew being below decks and the addition of hammock netting in iron brackets intended to slow or stop smaller shot. Second, the shot was cast large enough to cut rigging, destroy spars and blocks, and puncture multiple sails.

Canister shot, also known as case shot, fired a larger number of smaller projectiles loosely packaged in a tin or brass container, possibly guided by a wooden sabot. The later shrapnel shell contained similarly smaller projectiles, and used a timed bursting charge to expel those projectiles from the front of the container.

Langrage is a type of improvised round that uses chain links, nails, shards of glass, rocks or other similar objects as the projectiles. Although langrage can be cheaply made, its ballistics are inferior to that of metal spheres.

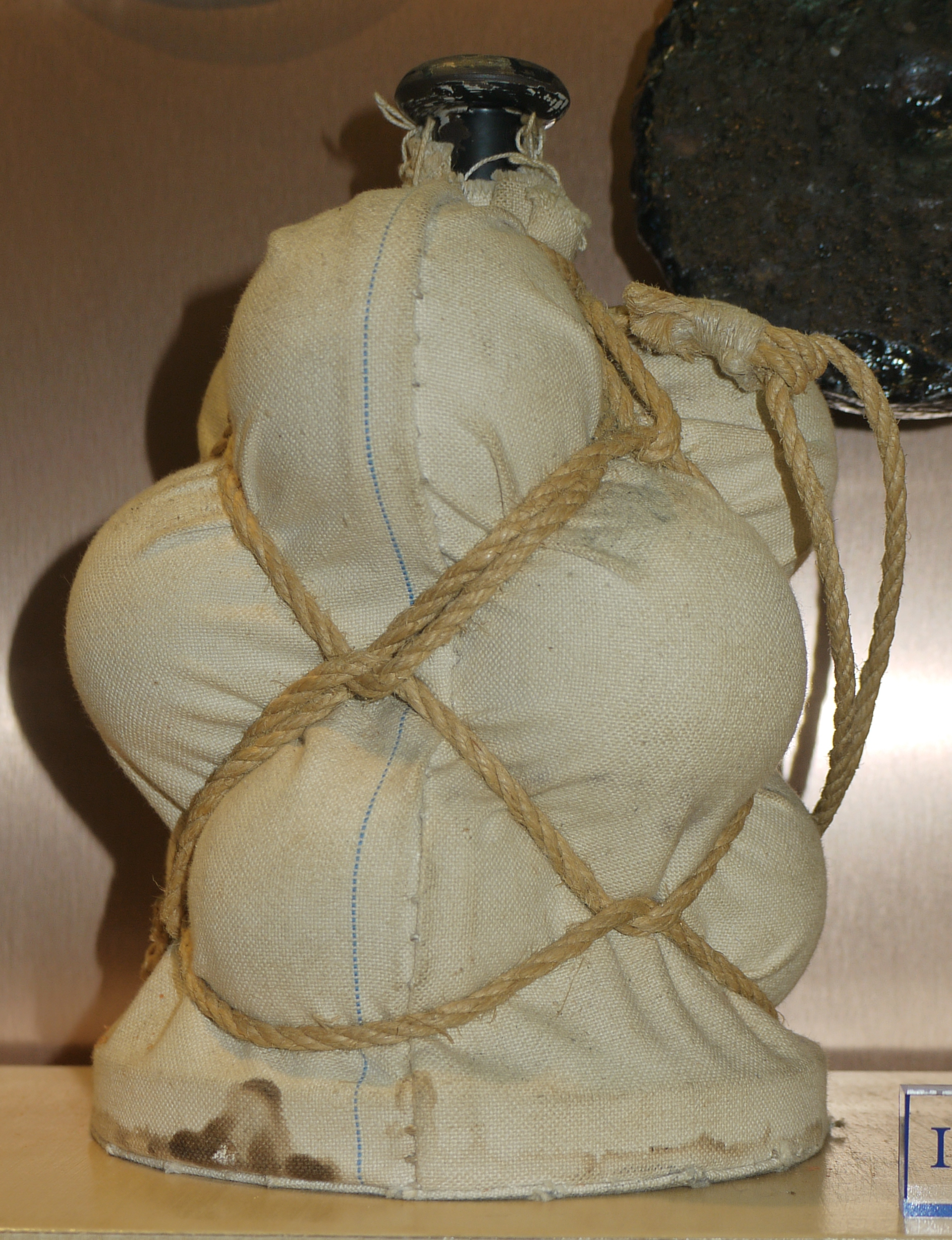
An example of grapeshot

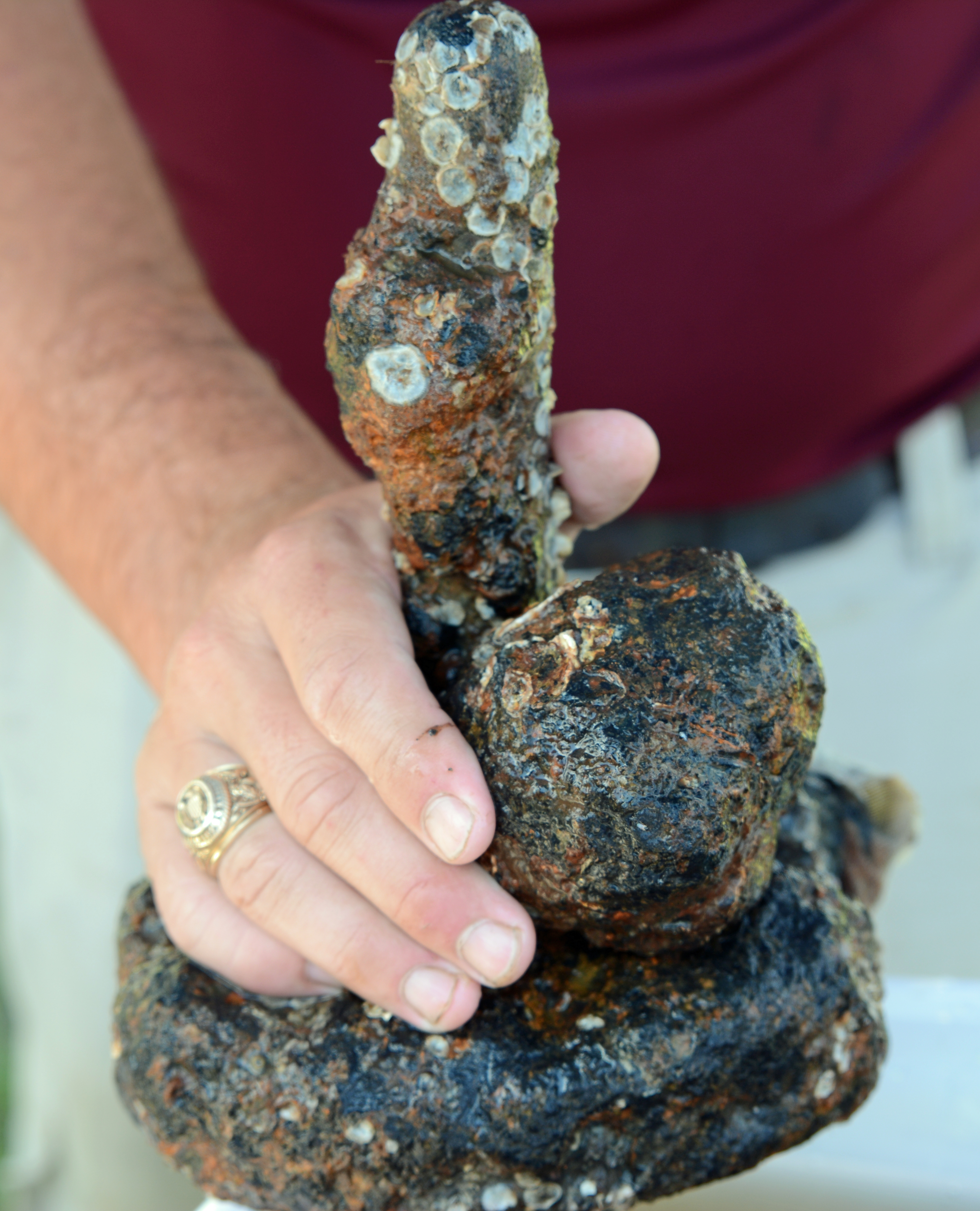
A small cannonball and holder for a grapeshot recovered from the CSS Georgia in 2015

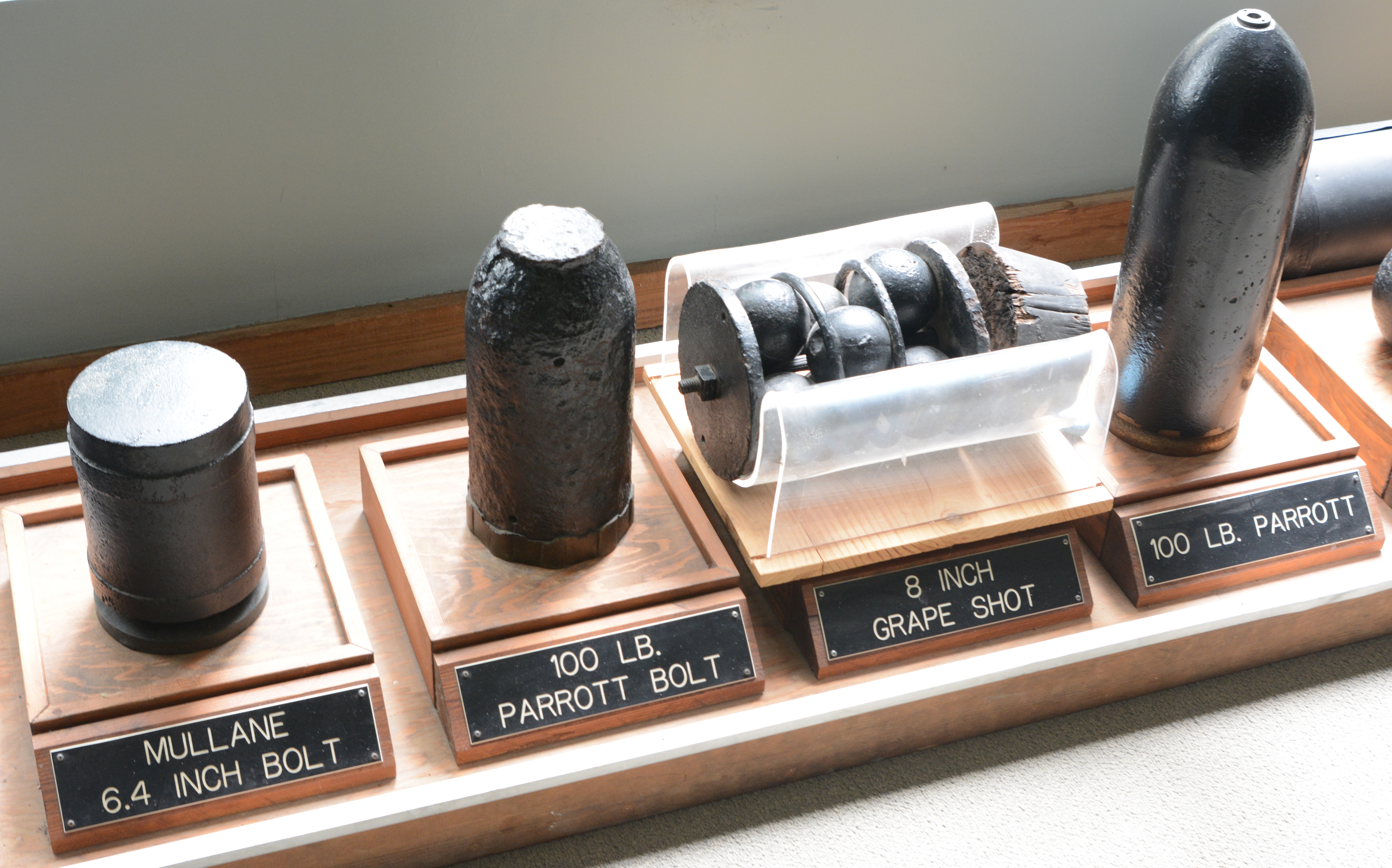
Munitions at Fort McAllister, showing a grapeshot projectile

== See also ==
- 13 Vendémiaire famous use of grapeshot
- Beehive anti-personnel round
- Chain-shot—a shot consisting of metal chains
- Salvo
- Shotgun shell, functionally identical small arms ammunition
- Swivel shot
