= Damages (disambiguation) =

Damages are the money paid or awarded to a claimant in a civil action.

Damages may also refer to:

- Damages (TV series), a legal drama
- Damages (Jewish law), a range of jurisprudential topics that roughly correspond in secular law to torts
- "Damages" (song), 2021 single by Tems
- Nezikin or Damages, the fourth Order of the Mishna

== See also ==
- Damage (disambiguation)
- Consequential damages, one kind of damages that may be awarded to plaintiff in a civil action
- Expectation damages, a form of damages available as a recourse to a breached contract
- Liquidated damages, damages which are liquidated/assessed and fixed at the date of the contract
- Punitive damages, damages awarded to mark the court's disapproval of a particular conduct
- Speculative damages, claims made by a plaintiff for losses that may occur in the future
- Statutory damages, damages recoverable pursuant to statute
- Treble damages
