= Concrete bomb =

Aerial bomb containing dense, inert material, using kinetic energy instead of explosives

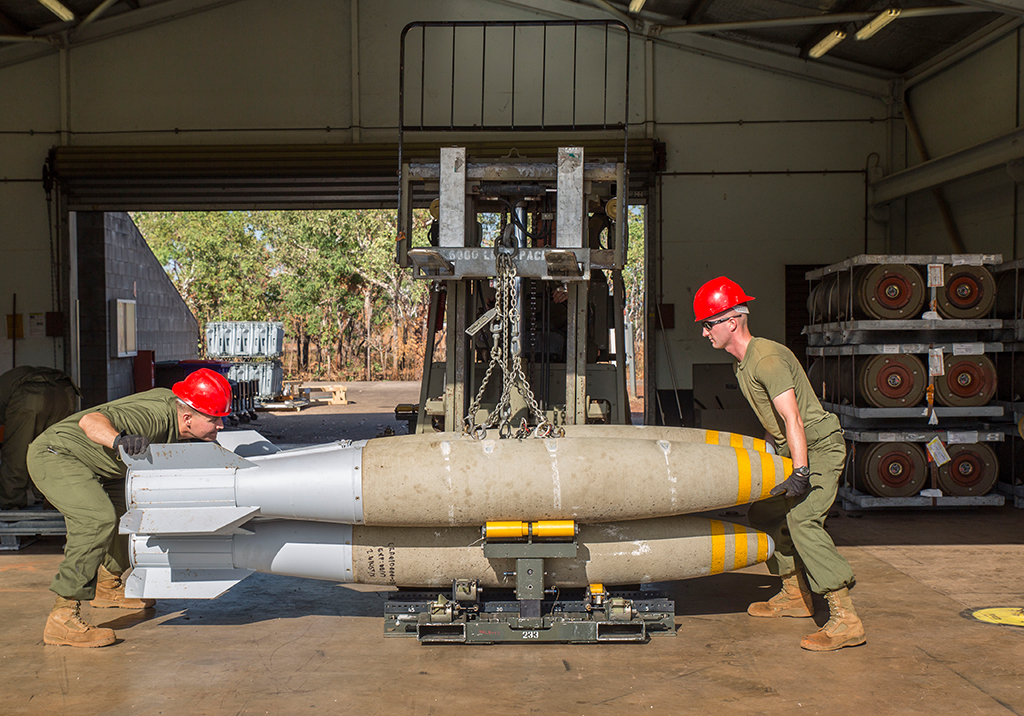
Two United States Marine Corps aviation ordnance technicians handling concrete bombs in 2016

A concrete bomb is an aerial bomb containing dense, inert material (typically concrete) instead of explosive. The target is destroyed using the kinetic energy of the falling bomb, making it a kinetic energy weapon. Such weapons can only practically be deployed when configured as a laser-guided bomb or other form of smart bomb, as a direct hit on a small target is required to cause significant damage. They are typically used to destroy military vehicles and artillery pieces in urban areas to minimize collateral damage and civilian casualties.

Guided or unguided concrete bombs may also be used for training pilots and ground personnel, due to the advantages of cost (no explosives or fusing), ease of precise and accurate point of impact determination, minimized bombing range damage, and increased safety (when the bomb is deployed, it is inert). Concrete bombs are also used in testing and evaluation of aircraft and bombs, such as the BDU-50.

Concrete bombs have been used by the United States during the Iraqi no-fly zones conflict, and by France during the 2011 military intervention in Libya.

== See also ==
- Kinetic bombardment
- Lazy Dog (bomb)
- Roof knocking
