= Kinetic energy weapon =

Weapon based solely on a projectile's kinetic energy

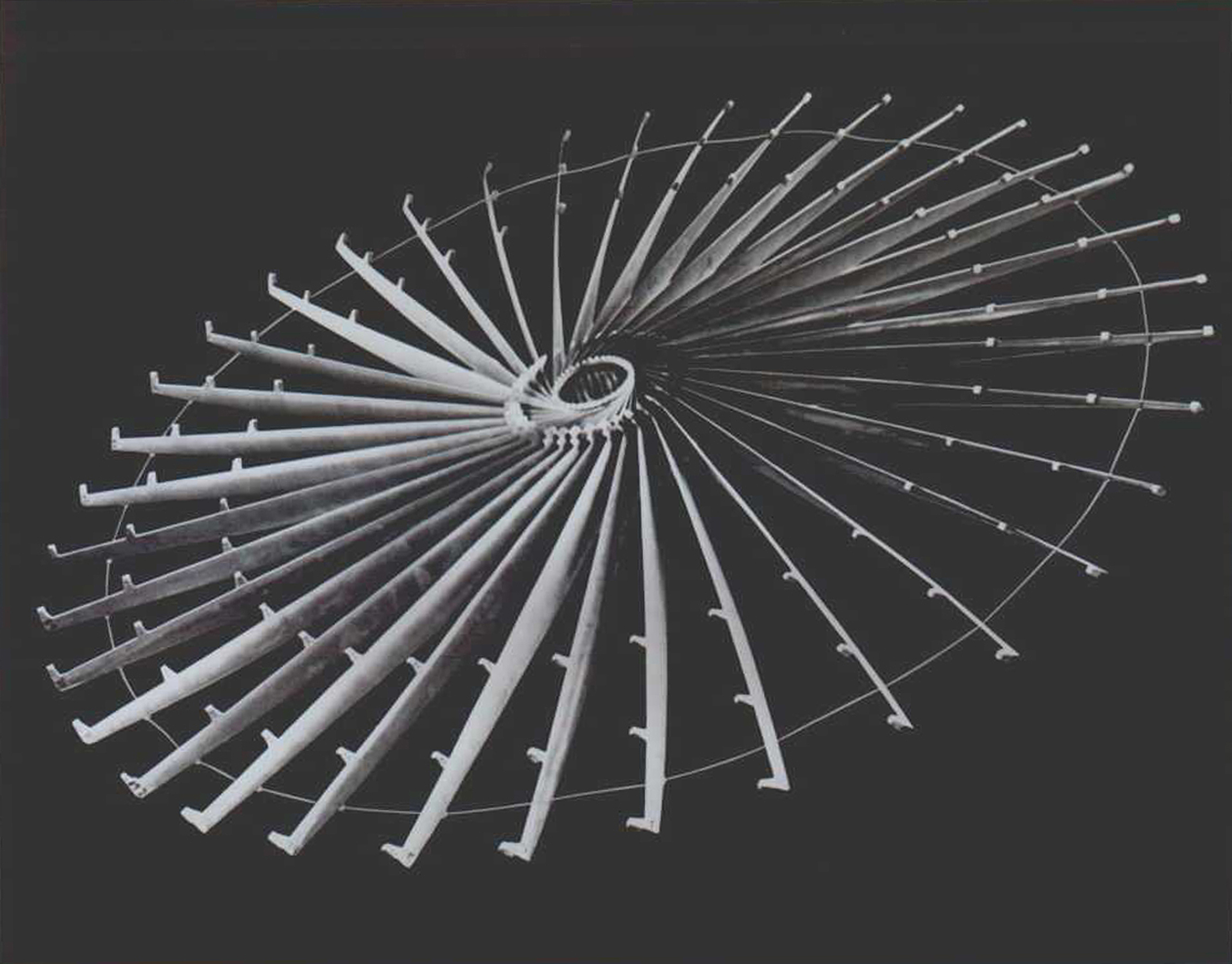
The Homing Overlay Experiment used a metal fan that was rolled up during launch and expanded during flight. The metal has five times as much destructive power as an explosive warhead of the same weight.

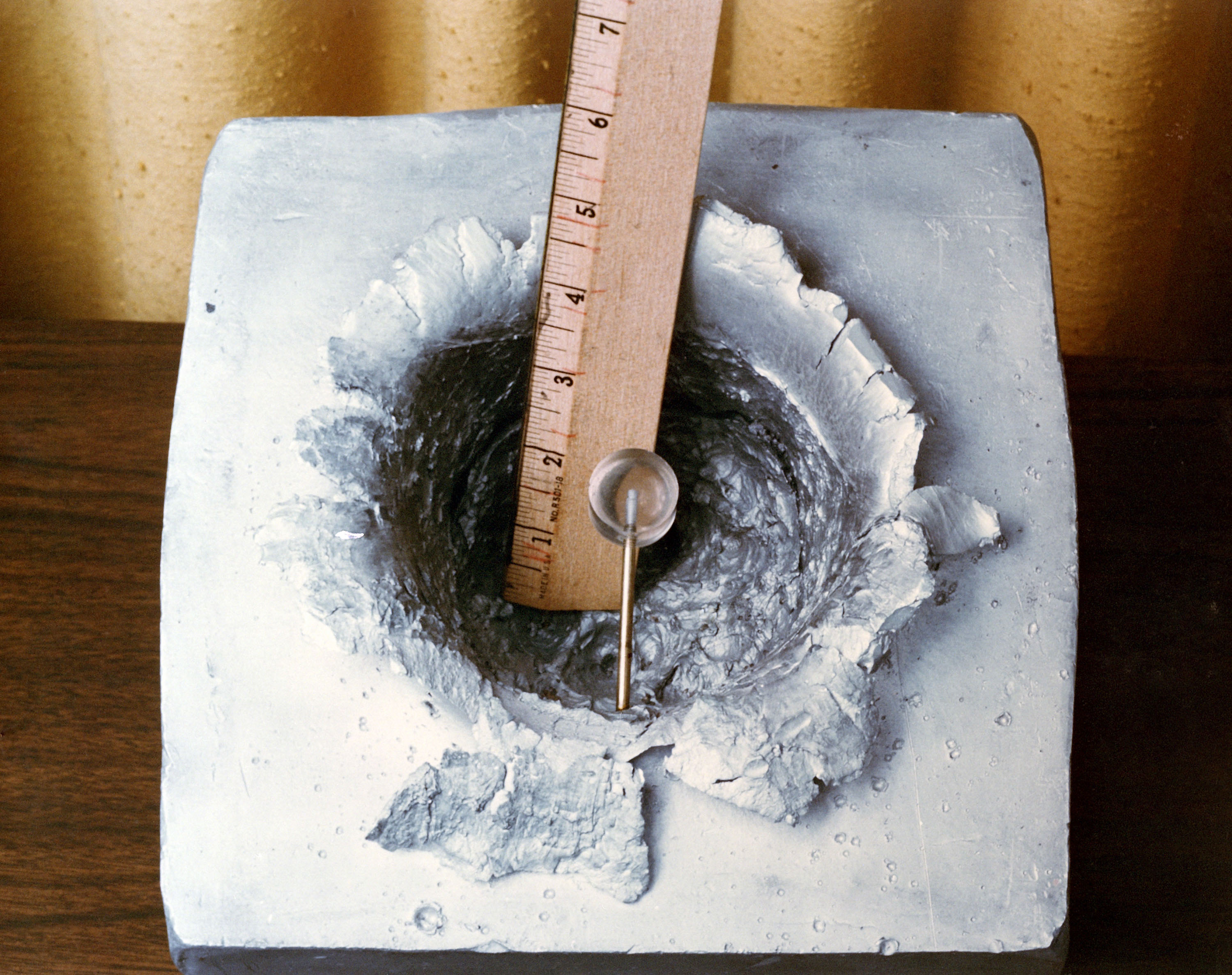
Sample from a kinetic energy weapon test. A piece of polycarbonate plastic weighing 7 grams (1/4 oz) was fired at an aluminium block at 7 km/s (23,000 ft/s), giving it a muzzle energy of 171,500 J (126,500 ft⋅lbf); a typical rifle bullet has a muzzle energy in the range of a few thousand joules, with the anti materiel .50 BMG reaching 20,000 J (15,000 ft⋅lbf).

A kinetic energy weapon (also known as kinetic weapon, kinetic energy warhead, kinetic warhead, kinetic projectile, kinetic kill vehicle) is a projectile weapon based solely on a projectile's kinetic energy to inflict damage to a target, instead of using any explosive, incendiary, chemical or radiological payload. All kinetic weapons work by attaining a high flight speed – generally supersonic or even up to hypervelocity – and collide with their targets, converting their kinetic energy and relative impulse into destructive shock waves, heat and cavitation. In kinetic weapons with unpowered flight, the muzzle velocity or launch velocity often determines the effective range and potential damage of the kinetic projectile.

Kinetic weapons are the oldest and most common ranged weapons used in human history, with the projectiles varying from blunt projectiles such as rocks and round shots, pointed missiles such as arrows, bolts, darts, and javelins, to modern tapered high-velocity impactors such as bullets, flechettes, and penetrators. Typical kinetic weapons accelerate their projectiles mechanically (by muscle power, mechanical advantage devices, elastic energy or pneumatics) or chemically (by propellant combustion, as with firearms), but newer technologies are enabling the development of potential weapons using electromagnetically launched projectiles, such as railguns, coilguns and mass drivers. There are also concept weapons that are accelerated by gravity, as in the case of kinetic bombardment weapons designed for space warfare.

The term hit-to-kill, or kinetic kill, is also used in the military aerospace field to describe kinetic energy weapons accelerated by a rocket engine. It has been used primarily in the anti-ballistic missile (ABM) and anti-satellite weapon (ASAT) fields, but some modern anti-aircraft missiles are also kinetic kill vehicles. Hit-to-kill systems are part of the wider class of kinetic projectiles, a class that has widespread use in the anti-tank field.

== Basic concept ==
Kinetic energy is a function of mass and the velocity of an object. For a kinetic energy weapon in the aerospace field, both objects are moving and it is the relative velocity that is important. (Note: As opposed to the anti-tank field, where the velocity of the tank can be approximated as zero compared to that of the weapon.) In the case of the interception of a reentry vehicle (RV) from an intercontinental ballistic missile (ICBM) during the terminal phase of the approach, the RV will be traveling at approximately 15,000 miles per hour (24,000 km/h) while the interceptor will be on the order of 7,000 miles per hour (11,000 km/h). Because the interceptor may not be approaching head-on, a lower bound on the relative velocity on the order of 16,000 miles per hour (26,000 km/h) can be assumed, or converting to SI units, approximately 7,150 m/s.

At that speed, every kilogram of the interceptor will have an energy of:

$KE = \frac{1}{2} m {v^2} = \frac{1}{2} \times 1\,\mathrm{kg}\times \left(7,150\,\mathrm{\frac{m}{s}}\right)^2 = 25,561,250\ \mathrm{J} \approx 26\ \mathrm{MJ}$

TNT has an explosive energy of about 4,184 joules per gram, or about 4.2 MJ per kilogram. That means the impact energy of the mass of the interceptor is over five times that of a detonating warhead of the same mass.

It may seem like this makes a warhead superfluous, but a hit-to-kill system has to actually hit the target, which may be on the order of half a meter wide, while a conventional warhead releases numerous small fragments that increase the possibility of impact over a much larger area, albeit with a much smaller impact mass. This has led to alternative concepts that attempt to spread out the potential impact zone without explosives. The SPAD concept of the 1960s used a metal net with small steel balls that would be released from the interceptor missile, while the Homing Overlay Experiment of the 1980s used a fan-like metal disk.

As the accuracy and speed of modern surface-to-air missiles (SAMs) improved, and their targets began to include theatre ballistic missiles (TBMs), many existing systems have moved to hit-to-kill attacks as well. This includes the MIM-104 Patriot, whose PAC-3 version removed the warhead and upgraded the solid fuel rocket motor to produce an interceptor missile that is much smaller overall, as well as the RIM-161 Standard Missile 3, which is dedicated to the anti-missile role.

== Delivery ==
Some kinetic weapons for targeting objects in spaceflight are anti-satellite weapons and anti-ballistic missiles. Since in order to reach an object in orbit it is necessary to attain an extremely high velocity, their released kinetic energy alone is enough to destroy their target; explosives are not necessary. For example: the energy of TNT is 4.2 MJ/kg, and the energy of a kinetic kill vehicle with a closing speed of 10 km/s (22,000 mph) is 50 MJ/kg. For comparison, 50 MJ is equivalent to the kinetic energy of a school bus weighing 5 metric tons, traveling at 509 km/h (316 mph; 141 m/s). This saves costly weight and there is no detonation to be precisely timed. This method, however, requires direct contact with the target, which requires a more accurate trajectory. Some hit-to-kill warheads are additionally equipped with an explosive directional warhead to enhance the kill probability (e.g. Israeli Arrow missile or U.S. Patriot PAC-3).

With regard to anti-missile weapons, the Arrow missile and MIM-104 Patriot PAC-2 have explosives, while the Kinetic Energy Interceptor (KEI), Lightweight Exo-Atmospheric Projectile (LEAP, used in Aegis BMDS), and THAAD do not (see Missile Defense Agency).

A kinetic projectile can also be dropped from aircraft. This is applied by replacing the explosives of a regular bomb with a non-explosive material (e.g. concrete), for a precision hit with less collateral damage; these are called concrete bombs. A typical bomb has a mass of 900 kg (2,000 lb) and a speed of impact of 800 km/h (500 mph). It is also applied for training the act of dropping a bomb with explosives. This method has been used in Operation Iraqi Freedom and the subsequent military operations in Iraq by mating concrete-filled training bombs with JDAM GPS guidance kits, to attack vehicles and other relatively "soft" targets located too close to civilian structures for the use of conventional high explosive bombs.

=== Divert and attitude control ===
When targeting objects in spaceflight, the final part of the kinetic vehicle's travel occurs in thin atmosphere or the near-vacuum of space. As a result, aerodynamic surfaces will have little use in course-correction, and rocket thrusters need to be used. The basic paradigm used for this purpose is a divert and attitude control system (DACS), with four divert thrusters and six attitude control nozzles attached to the KV. This kind of design is found in many anti-missile and anti-satellite weapons, including the RIM-161 Standard Missile 3, THAAD and L-SAM. A common design uses a DACS driven by a solid fuel gas generator, with the gas then distributed among the thrusters and nozzles as required for intercept. Neutral coasting is achieved by making the thrusters cancel each other out. The gas generator can be made throttle-able and/or re-ignitable.

== Advantages and disadvantages ==
The primary advantage of kinetic energy weapons is that they minimize the launch mass of the weapon, as no weight has to be set aside for a separate warhead. Every part of the weapon, including the airframe, electronics and even the unburned maneuvering fuel contributes to the destruction of the target. Lowering the total mass of the vehicle offers advantages in terms of the required launch vehicle needed to reach the required performance, and also reduces the mass that needs to be accelerated during maneuvering.

Another advantage of kinetic energy weapons is that any impact will almost certainly guarantee the destruction of the target. In contrast, a weapon using a blast fragmentation warhead will produce a large cloud of small fragments that will not cause as much destruction on impact. Both will produce effects that can easily be seen at long distance using radar or infrared detectors, but such a signal will generally indicate complete destruction in the case of a kinetic energy weapon while the fragmentation case does not guarantee a "kill".

No chemical munitions in the weapons also means that there is far less pollution of an area from a kinetic weapon. They are also much safer to store.

The main disadvantage of the kinetic energy weapons is that they require extremely high accuracy in the guidance system, on the order of 0.5 metres (2 ft).

== See also ==
- Exoatmospheric Kill Vehicle – Interceptor part of the Ground-Based Midcourse Defense manufactured by Raytheon
- Hellfire R9X – American air-to-surface missile
- Kinetic bombardment – Orbit to planetary surface attack with inert projectiles
- Terminal ballistics – Projectiles' behavior after reaching their targets
- Rods from God – Orbit to planetary surface attack with inert projectiles

== Bibliography ==
- "Missile Defense: Meeting the Challenge Head On". Lockheed Martin. 22 March 2018.
- "Kinetic Energy Hit-To-Kill Warhead". GlobalSecurity.org.
