= Direct fire =

Weapons firing with line of sight on target

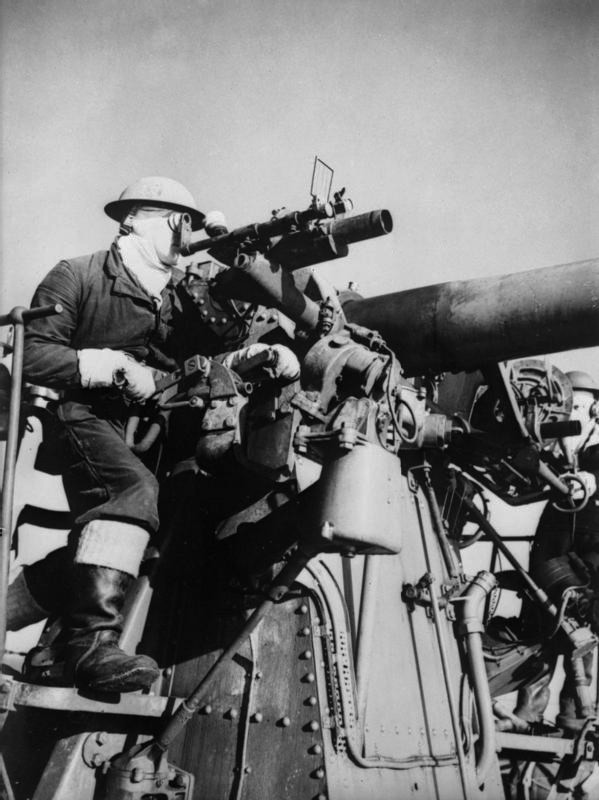
A gunner aiming a QF 4-inch Mk V naval gun for direct firing

Direct fire or line-of-sight fire refers to shooting of a ranged weapon whose projectile/ordnance is launched directly at a target within the line-of-sight of the user. Direct fire weapons typically have a sighting device to ensure accuracy and must have an unobstructed view to the target with no obstacles or friendly units in between, meaning that they can only effectively engage targets that are in enfilade. Conversely, direct fire units are also directly exposed to return fire from the target unless they are shooting from a position of defilade or concealment.

Direct fire is in contrast to indirect fire, which refers to firing a projectile on a curved ballistic trajectory or delivering self-accelerated munitions capable of long range and various degrees of homing abilities to alter the flight path. Indirect fire does not need a direct line-of-sight to the target because the shots are normally directed by a forward observer who provides the coordinates and calibrations needed to hit the target. As such, indirect-fire weapons can shoot over obstacles or friendly units and the weapons can be concealed from counter-battery fire.

== Description ==
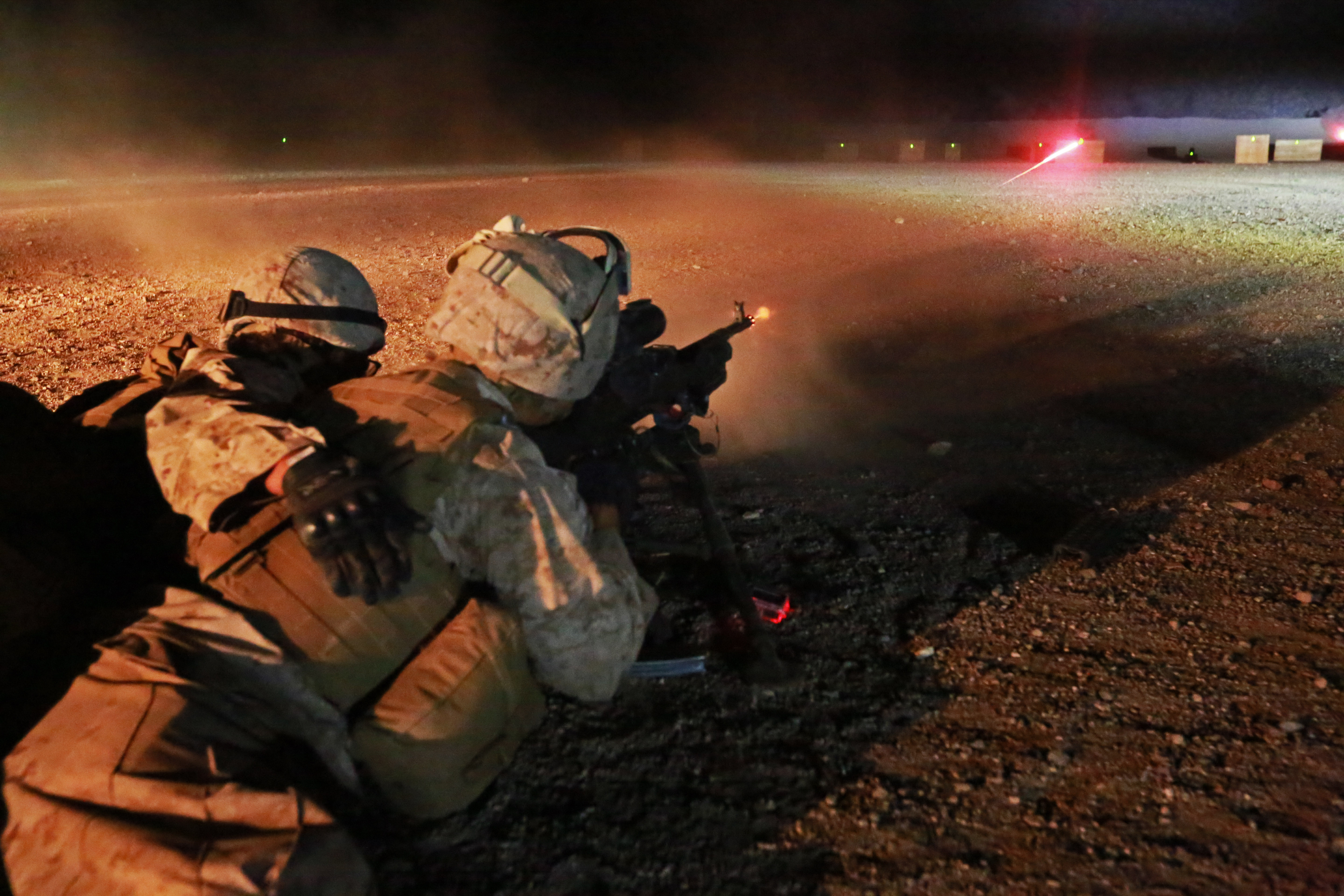
The most basic form of direct fire is from a firearm, seen in this image of an M240 machine gun firing tracer ammunition

Examples of direct-fire weapons include most ancient and modern weapons such as slings, blowguns, bows, crossbows, firearms, and recoilless rifles. The term is most often used in the context of artillery, such as howitzers and mortars. Direct fire remained the dominant method of operating artillery throughout most of human history, with indirect fire used for sieges and involving specific siege guns. Technological developments born of the Industrial Revolution and the development of technical practices in the late 19th century led to an appreciation of indirect fire, although it was not until World War I that indirect fire supplanted direct fire as the primary method by which artillery supported the other combat arms. During World War II direct fire remained secondary to indirect fire, although it was used profusely in situations where indirect fire was less effective, and new direct-fire artillery such as anti-tank guns and anti-aircraft guns were developed.

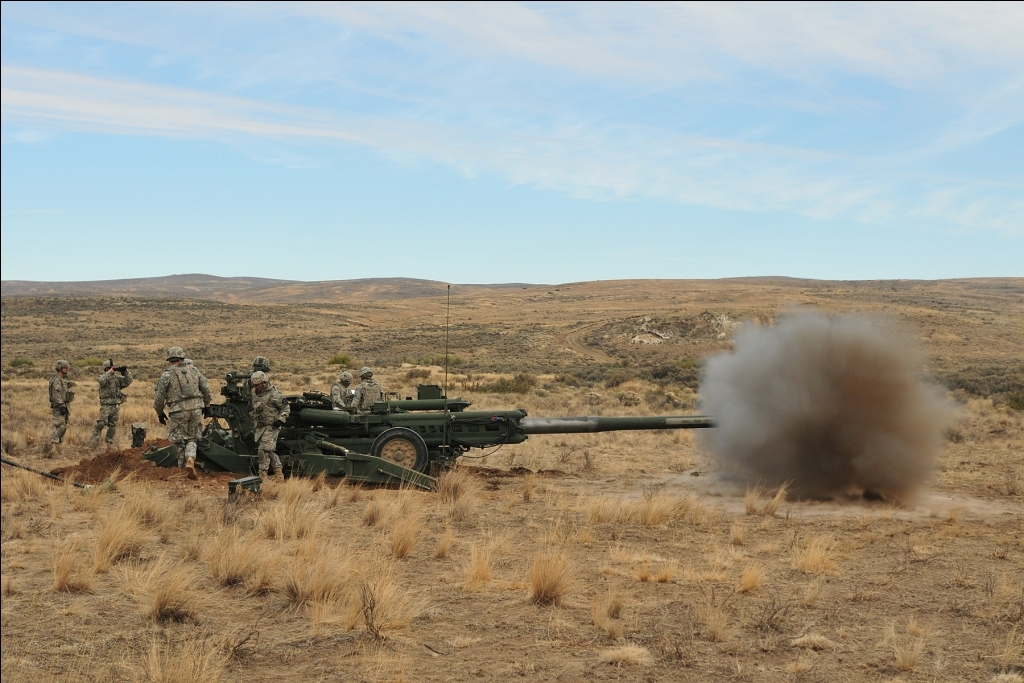
An M777 howitzer using direct fire

After World War II new technology continued to diminish the role of direct fire; however, in several situations it remains a necessary function on the modern battlefield. One of these is the defense of fixed fortified areas—for example fire support bases—for which specific firing techniques and munitions such as Killer Junior and Beehive anti-personnel rounds were developed. Another is when artillery is forced to defend itself, such as in a surprise attack. This could be the result of rapid maneuvering by ground forces, an attack by airborne troops, or from the lack of defined front lines as found in counterinsurgency operations. Direct-fire artillery can also be massed to counter a penetration by enemy tanks. In particular self-propelled artillery are ideally suited for this role on account of their mobility, armor protection, and faster rate of fire compared to other weapons. A final situation is in urban warfare, where locating the enemy can be difficult, the physical structures give the defenders better protection, and the risk of collateral damage is high. In these cases direct-fire artillery can unleash tremendous firepower to precisely destroy enemy fortified positions. For example, during the Siege of Marawi, the Armed Forces of the Philippines used 105mm M101 howitzers in close-range to combat Abu Sayyaf and Maute Group terrorists who fortified themselves in several buildings.

== See also ==
- Director (military) – Computer that calculates aiming for weapons
- Fire-control radar – Narrowly focused radar beam whose reflected signal is used to obtain a missile lock-on
- Gun laying – Process of aiming an artillery piece or turret
- Line-of-sight (missile)
- Telescopic sight – Optical sighting device for firearms
