= Canister shot =

Class of ammunition used by artillery

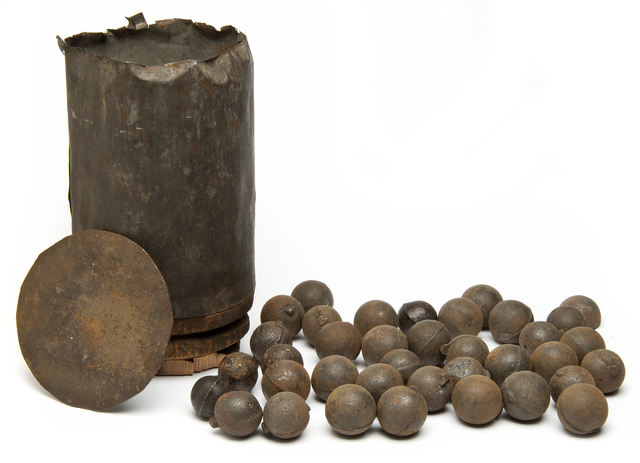
Artillery shot-canister for a 12-pounder cannon from the US Civil War era. From the collection of the Minnesota Historical Society. Note the uniform, regularly shaped projectiles, unlike langrage.

Canister shot is a kind of anti-personnel artillery ammunition. It has been used since the advent of gunpowder-firing artillery in Western armies, and saw particularly frequent use on land and at sea in the various wars of the 18th and 19th centuries. Canister is still used today in modern artillery.

== Description ==
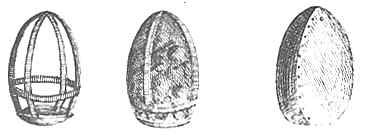
Examples of old case-shot, which predates the canister

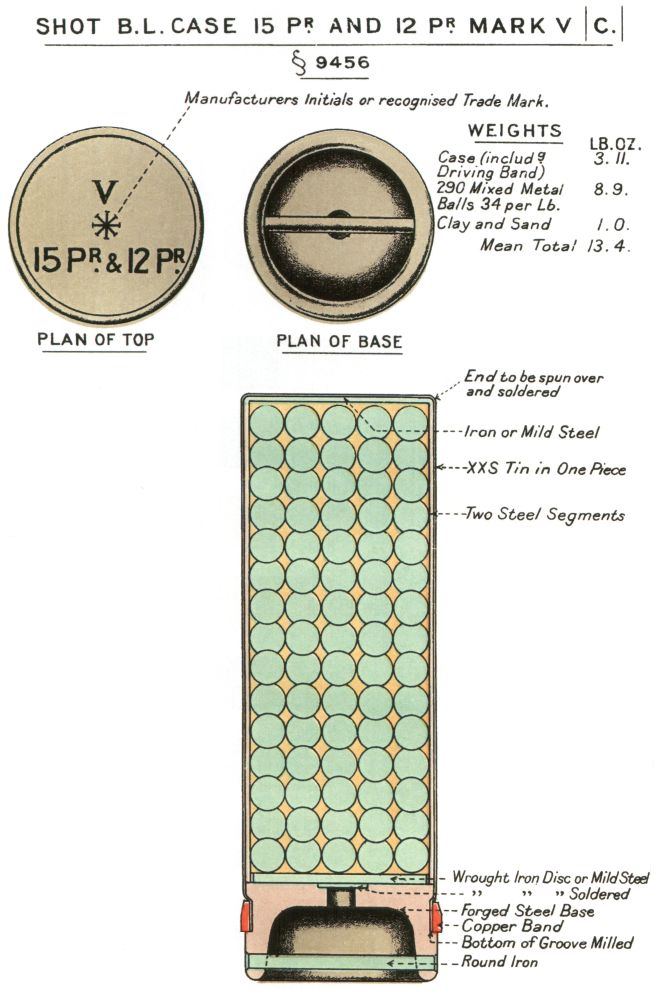
British case-shot, 1914

Canister shot consists of a closed metal cylinder typically loosely filled with round lead or iron balls packed with sawdust to add more solidity and cohesion to the mass and to prevent the balls from crowding each other when the round was fired. The canister itself was usually made of tin, often dipped in a lacquer of beeswax diluted with turpentine to prevent corrosion of the metal. Iron was substituted for tin for larger-caliber guns. The ends of the canister were closed with wooden or metal disks.

A cloth cartridge bag containing the round's gunpowder used to fire the canister from the gun barrel could be attached to the back of the metal canister for smaller caliber cannon. A sabot of wood, metal, or similar material was sometimes used to help the round during firing from the cannon.

Various types of canister were devised for specific models of artillery field pieces. In 1753, the "secret howitzer", a special gun with an oval bore—intended to spread shot even wider—was briefly introduced into Russian service, but ultimately proved unsuccessful. The Royal Artillery Museum at Woolwich, London, holds examples of two early 18th century experimental French wide bore cannon—flattened tubes intended to scatter canister wide but in one horizontal plane.

The United States Army developed a canister round, the M1028, for the M1 Abrams' 120 mm smoothbore gun in time for the 2003 invasion of Iraq. The effect is to turn a large-caliber gun on an armored fighting vehicle into a giant shotgun. This can be used against enemy infantry even when in proximity to friendly armoured vehicles, as the projectiles do not penetrate armour. In addition it can be used to create entry points to buildings, reduce wire obstacles and clear heavy vegetation, as well as strike low flying aircraft and helicopters.

== Langrage ==
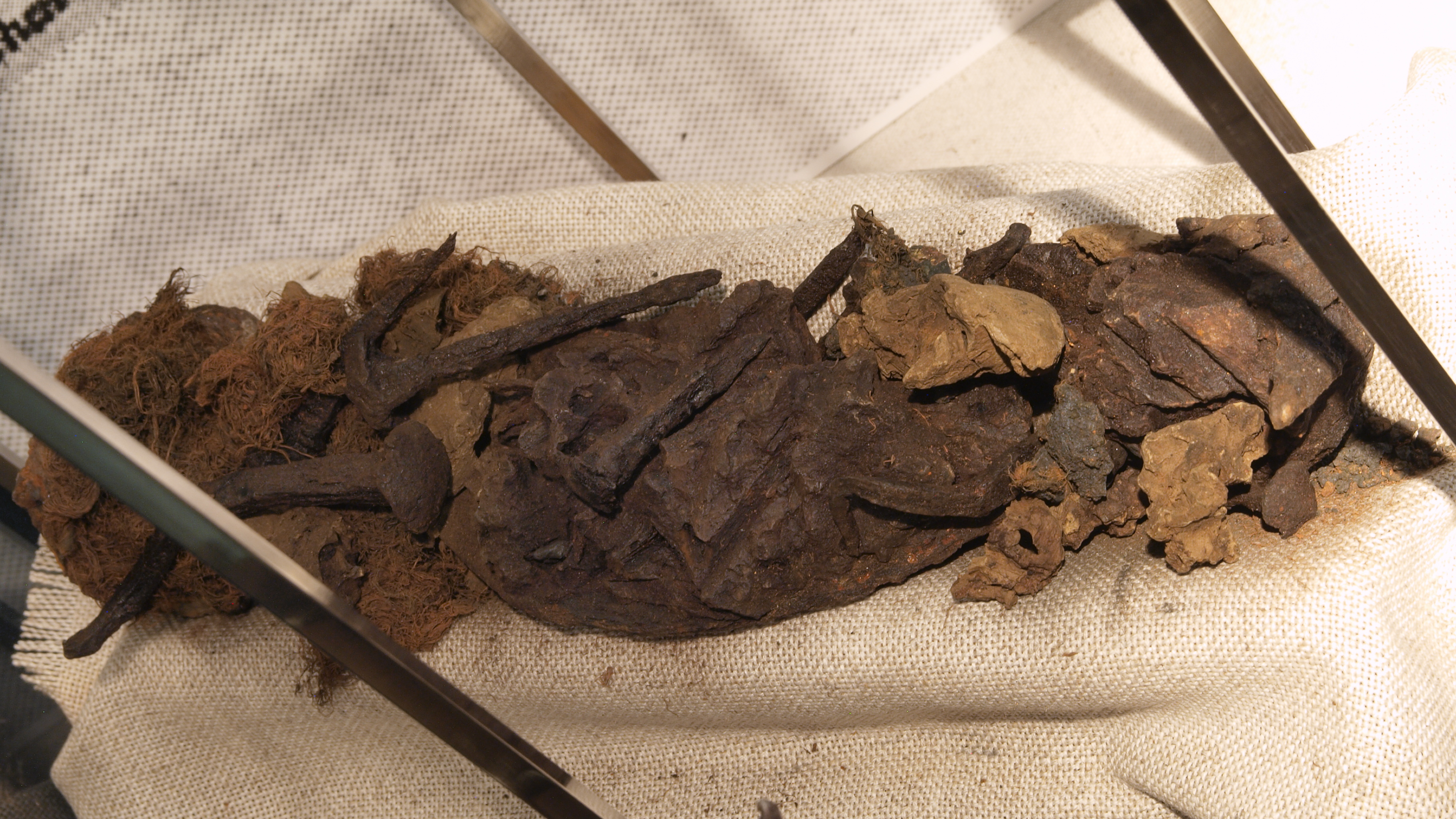
Langrage shot for a cannon of the early 17th century, consisting of iron nails, iron fragments, loam, and hemp fabric, as a substitute for spherical metal projectiles.

At times when the supply of balls were limited, nails, scrap iron or lead, wire, and other similar metal objects were included. The projectile had been known since at least the 16th century and was known by various nicknames in the 17th century such as hailshot or partridge shot. Rounds recovered from Henry VIII's warship Mary Rose (sunk 1545) were wooden cylinders filled with broken flint flakes. When filled with rubbish or scrap (rather than round bullets) the round could be known as scrapshot or langrage. In 1718, Blackbeard armed his guns with a range of makeshift weaponry including langrage. Several of his cannons, still loaded with spikes and shot, have been recovered from the wreck site of his flagship, the Queen Anne's Revenge. Archaeologists have also retrieved conglomerations of lead shot, nails, spikes and glass from the site. Langrage was also found among the artifact assemblage of the Mardi Gras shipwreck, 4,000 ft (1219 m) deep in the Gulf of Mexico.

== Effectiveness ==
When fired, the canister disintegrates and its shards and projectiles spread out in a conical formation, causing a wide swath of destruction. It was particularly effective during the Napoleonic Wars and the American Civil War, where massed troops at close range (usually less than 400 yards) could be broken up by artillery batteries firing canister. At times, particularly at very close range, artillery crews would fire extremely lethal "double canister," where two rounds were loaded into the gun tube and fired simultaneously using a single charge. At the Battle of Waterloo, in 1815, Mercer's Troop, Royal Horse Artillery, fired a roundshot and a canister from each gun as a double-shot. The roundshot was loaded first with the canister on top. Canister played a key role for Union forces during their defeat of Confederate troops in Pickett's Charge during the Battle of Gettysburg in July 1863. In 1864 at the Battle of Brice's Cross Roads the Confederates used this method.

At times, trained artillerists would fire the canister shot towards the ground in front of advancing enemy troops, causing the conical pattern to flatten out as the balls ricocheted and skipped off the terrain. This in effect widened the killing zone. An example of this tactic was on the first day of Gettysburg, where Lt. James Stewart's Battery B, 4th U.S. Artillery on Seminary Ridge skipped canister shot at Alfred M. Scales's approaching Confederate infantry, breaking up their attack and forcing them to take cover in a depression.

Canister shot was also used to good effect by U.S. Marine 37 mm anti-tank guns in World War II to break up Japanese banzai charges.

During the Korean War United Nations tanks experienced close-range massed infantry attacks from Communist forces. As a consequence a canister-type tank round was introduced to "sweep" enemy infantry off friendly tanks without harming friendly tank crews, who were behind canister-proof armor. UK weapons known to have fielded a canister round are the 76 mm and 105 mm tank guns and the 120 mm MOBAT and WOMBAT recoilless anti-tank guns.

== Similar multi-projectile ammunition ==
Shrapnel shells—named for the inventor, British artillery officer Henry Shrapnel—were developed from canister during the Napoleonic Wars and were intended to deliver the same canister effect, but at much longer ranges. As a result, its early designation was "spherical case shot". Instead of a tin can filled with metal balls, the shrapnel shells carry a small powder charge to break open the case and disperse the shrapnel.

Grapeshot was a geometric arrangement of round shot packed tightly into a canvas bag and separated from the gunpowder charge by a metal disk of full bore diameter. Grapeshot used fewer but larger projectiles than were contained within canister or shrapnel shells.

Case shot broadly describes any multi-projectile artillery ammunition. The canister round is known as a case, so canister was sometimes called case shot and the term has confusingly become generic for grapeshot and shrapnel shells. However, the term case shot is also used to describe a hollow ball containing a powder charge and bullets. After firing the iron ball the powder would explode, scattering the bullets.

== See also ==
- Beehive anti-personnel round
- Chain shot
- Cluster munition, a form of air-dropped or ground-launched explosive weapon that releases or ejects smaller submunitions
- Dual-purpose improved conventional munition (DPICM), a type of artillery ammunition similar to canister shot but with explosive submunitions
- Field artillery in the American Civil War
- Heated shot

== Bibliography ==
- Cole, Philip M., Civil War Artillery at Gettysburg, Da Capo Press, 2002, ISBN 0-306-81145-6.
