= Kinetic bombardment =

Orbit to planetary surface attack with inert projectiles

A kinetic bombardment or a kinetic orbital strike is the hypothetical act of attacking a planetary surface with an inert kinetic projectile from orbit (orbital bombardment), where the destructive power comes from the kinetic energy of the projectile impacting at very high speeds. The concept originated during the Cold War.

Typical depictions of the tactic are of a satellite containing a magazine of tungsten rods and a directional thrust system. When a strike is ordered, the launch vehicle brakes one of the rods out of its orbit and into a suborbital trajectory that intersects the target. The rods would typically be shaped to minimize air resistance and thus maximize velocity upon impact.

The kinetic bombardment has the advantage of being able to deliver projectiles from a very high angle at a very high speed, making them extremely difficult to defend against. In addition, projectiles would not require explosive warheads, and—in the simplest designs—would consist entirely of solid metal rods, giving rise to the common nickname "rods from God". Disadvantages include the technical difficulties of ensuring accuracy and the high costs of positioning ammunition in orbit.

== Real life concepts and theories ==
=== Predecessors and early concepts ===
During the Korean and Vietnam Wars, there was limited use of the Lazy Dog bomb, a kinetic projectile shaped like a conventional bomb but only about 1 3/4 inches (44 mm) long and 1/2 inch (13 mm) in diameter. A piece of sheet metal was folded to make the fins and welded to the rear of the projectile. These were dumped from aircraft onto enemy troops and had the same effect as a machine gun fired vertically. Similar flechette projectiles have been used since World War I.

In the 1980s, another kinetic swarm system was conceptualized as a potential part of the Strategic Defense Initiative, there codenamed Brilliant Pebbles.

Project Thor was an idea for a weapons system that launches telephone pole–sized kinetic projectiles made from tungsten from Earth's orbit to damage targets on the ground. Jerry Pournelle created the concept while working in operations research at Boeing in the 1950s before becoming a science-fiction writer.

=== 2003 United States Air Force proposal ===
A system described in the 2003 United States Air Force report called Hypervelocity Rod Bundles was that of 20-foot-long (6.1 m), 1-foot-diameter (0.30 m) tungsten rods that are satellite-controlled and have global strike capability, with impact speeds of Mach 10.

The bomb would naturally contain large kinetic energy because it moves at orbital velocities, around 8 kilometres per second (26,000 ft/s; Mach 24) in orbit and 3 kilometres per second (9,800 ft/s; Mach 8.8) at impact. As the rod reenters Earth's atmosphere, it would lose most of its velocity, but the remaining energy would cause considerable damage. Some systems are quoted as having the yield of a small tactical nuclear bomb. These designs are envisioned as a bunker buster. As the name suggests, the 'bunker buster' is powerful enough to destroy a nuclear bunker. With 6–8 satellites on a given orbit, a target could be hit within 12–15 minutes from any given time, less than half the time taken by an ICBM and without the launch warning. Such a system could also be equipped with sensors to detect incoming anti-ballistic missile-type threats and relatively light protective measures to use against them (e.g. hit-to-kill missiles or megawatt-class chemical laser). The time between deorbit and impact would only be a few minutes, and depending on the orbits and positions in the orbits, the system would have a worldwide range. There would be no need to deploy missiles, aircraft, or other vehicles.

In the case of the system mentioned in the 2003 Air Force report above, a 6.1 by 0.3 metres (20 ft × 1 ft) tungsten cylinder impacting at Mach 10 (11,200 ft/s; 3,400 m/s) has kinetic energy equivalent to approximately 11.5 tons of TNT (48 GJ). The mass of such a cylinder is itself greater than 9 short tons (8.2 t), so the practical applications of such a system are limited to those situations where its other characteristics provide a clear and decisive advantage—a conventional bomb/warhead of similar weight to the tungsten rod, delivered by conventional means, provides similar destructive capability and is far more practical and cost-effective.

The highly elongated shape and high mass of the projectiles are intended to enhance sectional density (and therefore minimize kinetic energy loss due to air friction) and maximize penetration of hard or buried targets. The larger device is expected to be quite effective at penetrating deeply buried bunkers and other command and control targets.

The weapon would be very hard to defend against. It has a very high closing velocity and a small radar cross-section. The launch is difficult to detect. Any infrared launch signature occurs in orbit, at no fixed position. The infrared launch signature also has a much smaller magnitude compared to a ballistic missile launch. The system would also have to cope with atmospheric heating from re-entry, which could melt non-tungsten components of the weapon.

The phrase "rods from God" is used to describe the same concept.

== In science fiction ==
In the 1970s and 1980s, this idea was refined in science fiction novels such as Footfall by Larry Niven and Jerry Pournelle (the same Pournelle that first proposed the idea for military use in a non-fiction context), in which aliens use a Thor-type system. During the 1980s and 1990s, references to such weapons became a staple of science fiction roleplaying games such as Traveller, Shadowrun, and Heavy Gear (the first of these games naming such weapons ortillery, a portmanteau of orbital artillery), as well as visual media including Babylon 5's "mass drivers", the film The Last Starfighter, and the film Starship Troopers, itself an adaptation of the Heinlein novel of the same name.

=== Further examples ===
In The Moon Is a Harsh Mistress (1966) by Robert A. Heinlein, the lunar colonists repurpose a mass driver to launch large rocks at Earth as kinetic bombardment weapons. These projectiles rely solely on impact energy and are used as a form of asymmetric warfare against Earth's superior forces. The attacks serve both as a means of physical destruction and as a psychological weapon to pressure Earth into granting lunar independence.

Call of Duty: Ghosts features two kinetic bombardment weapons named Odin and Loki as story elements in the campaign, as well as in the multiplayer, where the Loki satellite could be used by a player if they had killed enough players in a row without dying.

In The Mote in God's Eye (1974) by Larry Niven and Jerry Pournelle, kinetic orbital bombardment is depicted as a strategic military option, utilizing high-velocity projectiles launched from space to inflict devastation on planetary targets. These weapons rely on pure kinetic energy rather than explosives, making them a precise and efficient alternative to nuclear strikes. The novel describes their use in planetary sieges, where spacecraft or orbital platforms fire dense, inert projectiles to penetrate defenses and infrastructure.

A smaller "crowbar" variant is mentioned in David's Sling by Marc Stiegler (Baen, 1988). Set in the Cold War, the story is based on the use of (relatively inexpensive) information-based "intelligent" systems to overcome an enemy's numerical advantage. The orbital kinetic bombardment system is used first to destroy the Soviet tank armies that have invaded Europe and then to take out Soviet ICBM silos prior to a nuclear strike.

In Nemesis Games (2015) by James S. A. Corey, kinetic orbital bombardment is depicted through the repurposing of civilian asteroid mining technology, where factions redirect space rocks as improvised weapons. Unlike traditional purpose-built kinetic strikes, this approach uses industrial infrastructure to covertly manipulate asteroids, turning them into high-mass projectiles without dedicated military systems. This highlights the novel intersection of commercial space operations and warfare, showcasing how everyday resource extraction methods can be weaponized in interplanetary conflict.

In Revelation Space (2000) by Alastair Reynolds, the assault on the world of Cerberus utilizes a two-stage kinetic bombardment strategy. First, a relativistic mass driver bombards the megastructure with high-velocity projectiles to weaken its defenses. This is followed by a lighthugger, a massive interstellar vessel that deliberately crashed into the planet, delivering a nanotechnological warfare payload deep into its crust.

The Halo franchise features the Magnetic Accelerator Cannon (MAC), or Mass Accelerator Cannon, as the primary weapon system employed by the United Nations Space Command (UNSC) on its warships and orbital defense platforms. Essentially large coilguns, MACs are capable of firing a variety of ammunition types varying on the model and bore, ranging from hyper-dense kinetic kill slugs to sub-caliber rounds to semi-autonomous drone missiles. Most predominantly featured in Halo Wars and Halo Wars 2, the MAC is an ability that allows the player to utilize the UNSC Spirit of Fire's point-defense MAC for pinpoint orbital bombardment, allowing the player to heavily damage or destroy enemy units. However, there are variants of the MAC platforms mounted to various ships and stations, with the most powerful being able to fire a 3,000-ton projectile at anywhere between 0.4% and 25% the speed of light.

In Seveneves (2015) by Neal Stephenson, kinetic orbital bombardment occurs as a natural consequence of the Moon's fragmentation, resulting in a sustained bombardment of Earth by high-velocity lunar debris. The impact energy of these fragments causes widespread devastation, leading to the collapse of civilization. Unlike conventional orbital strikes, this event highlights the destructive potential of natural celestial mechanics, framing kinetic bombardment as an existential threat.

The film G.I. Joe: Retaliation (2013) depicts the destruction of Central London with a tungsten rod dropped from a satellite system.

In Death's End (2010) by Cixin Liu, kinetic orbital bombardment is depicted through the use of near-light-speed projectiles, where objects are accelerated to relativistic velocities to maximize destructive energy. These strikes are capable of triggering planetary-scale catastrophes, as even small masses, when moving at a significant fraction of the speed of light, release immense kinetic energy upon impact. Unlike traditional orbital bombardment, which relies on gravity-assisted or mass-driver-launched projectiles, these attacks are executed with extreme precision using advanced acceleration technologies. This portrayal highlights the existential threat of relativistic warfare, where the sheer energy of kinetic strikes renders planetary defenses nearly obsolete.

In the video game Risk of Rain 2, players can unlock a skill called "OGM-72 'DIABLO' Strike" that allows them to call in a delayed kinetic strike from the UES Safe Travels, a spaceship orbiting the planet the game takes place in. The attack deals a profoundly high amount of damage.

Ace Combat 8: Wings of Theve features the Tonitrus Spear, a kinetic bombardment weapon created and used by Sotoa. It is used to open the Sotoa-Usea War via a surprise Tonitrus Spear strike on Expo City in Eastern Usea, and during the war its effective range came to be known as a no-man's land called the "Rainband". Its projectiles can be guided by GPS and INS, but in cases of adverse weather such as dense cloud cover, it can also be guided by laser designators mounted on airships and other aircraft.

== See also ==
- Boeing X-37
- Brilliant Pebbles
- Cobalt bomb
- Concrete bomb
- Flechette
- Fractional Orbital Bombardment System
- Kinetic energy penetrator
- Prompt Global Strike
- Railgun
