= Liz Miele =

American stand-up comedian (born 1985)

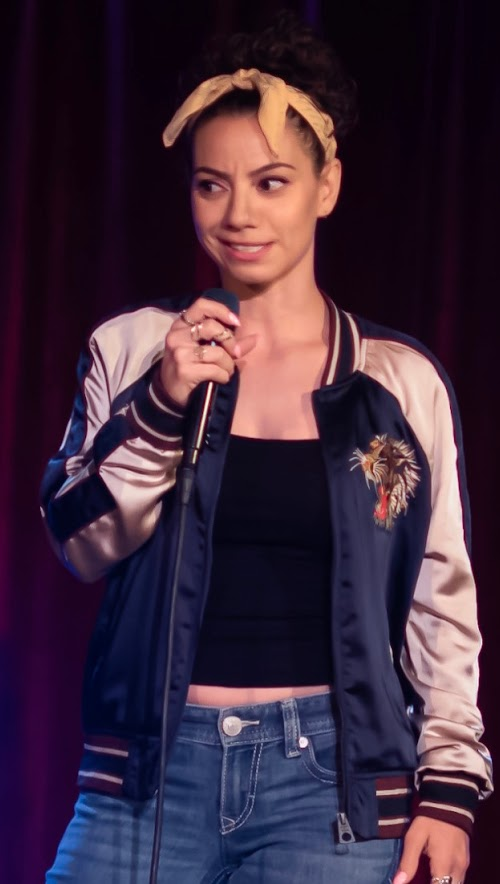
- Miele in 2023
- Born: Liz Miele; Pennington, New Jersey, U.S.
- Notable work: Murder Sheets, The Ghost of Academic Future, Self Help Me, Emotionally Exhausting, Mind of Melee
- Website: lizmiele.com

Liz Miele (born 1985) is an American stand-up comedian and writer based in New York City.

Born and raised in Pennington, New Jersey, Miele attended Hopewell Valley Central High School. She started doing stand-up comedy at age 16. As a teenager, she had a correspondence with George Carlin, who became a friend and mentor.

She has appeared on @fter Midnight, Comedy Central, FOX, AXS TV, Hulu, and Wait Wait Don't Tell Me. She is also the creator of the animated web series Damaged.

Miele has also been featured in The New Yorker, The New York Times, The Guardian and Paste magazine.

She has toured internationally, written a book, Why Cats Are Assholes, and has self-produced four one-hour comedy specials on YouTube, which have over 6 million views.

She has dyslexia.

== Filmography ==
=== Television ===
Year	Title	Role	Notes
2026	Best Medicine	Joy Cronk	
