= The Damage Done =

The Damage Done may refer to:

- The Damage Done (book), by Warren Fellows, 1997
- The Damage Done (EP), by Gumball, 1993

== See also ==
- Damage Done (disambiguation)
