= Destroyed =

Destroyed may refer to:

- Destroyed (Sloppy Seconds album), a 1989 album by Sloppy Seconds
- Destroyed (Moby album), a 2011 album by Moby

== See also ==
- Destruction (disambiguation)
- Ruined (disambiguation)
