= Beehive anti-personnel round =

Artillery round

Beehive was a Vietnam War era anti-personnel round packed with metal flechettes fired from an artillery gun most popularly deployed during that conflict. It is also known as flechette rounds or their official designation, antipersonnel-tracer (APERS-T). Typically, artillery gunners fire using indirect fire, firing at targets they cannot see by line of sight, with information provided by a forward observer. However, during the Vietnam War, there was a demand for a munition that could be fired directly at enemy troops, in cases where an artillery unit was attacked.

== History ==
The flechette rounds were developed under a contract administered by Picatinny Arsenal and led to the Whirlpool Corporation in April 1957. The contract was named the "Beehive Program" referring to the way the flechettes were compartmentalized and stacked, looking like the traditional image of a conical beehive. It was commonly assumed by users in the service that the term referred to a supposed 'buzzing' sound its darts made when flying through the air. The first example was the 105mm howitzer M546 anti-personnel tracer (APERS-T), first fired in combat in 1966 and thereafter used extensively in the Vietnam War. Intended for direct fire against enemy troops, the M546 was direct fired from a near horizontally leveled 105 mm howitzer and ejected 8000 flechettes during flight by a mechanical time fuse. Green starshells were shot into the air prior to their use to warn friendly troops that such a round was being shot.

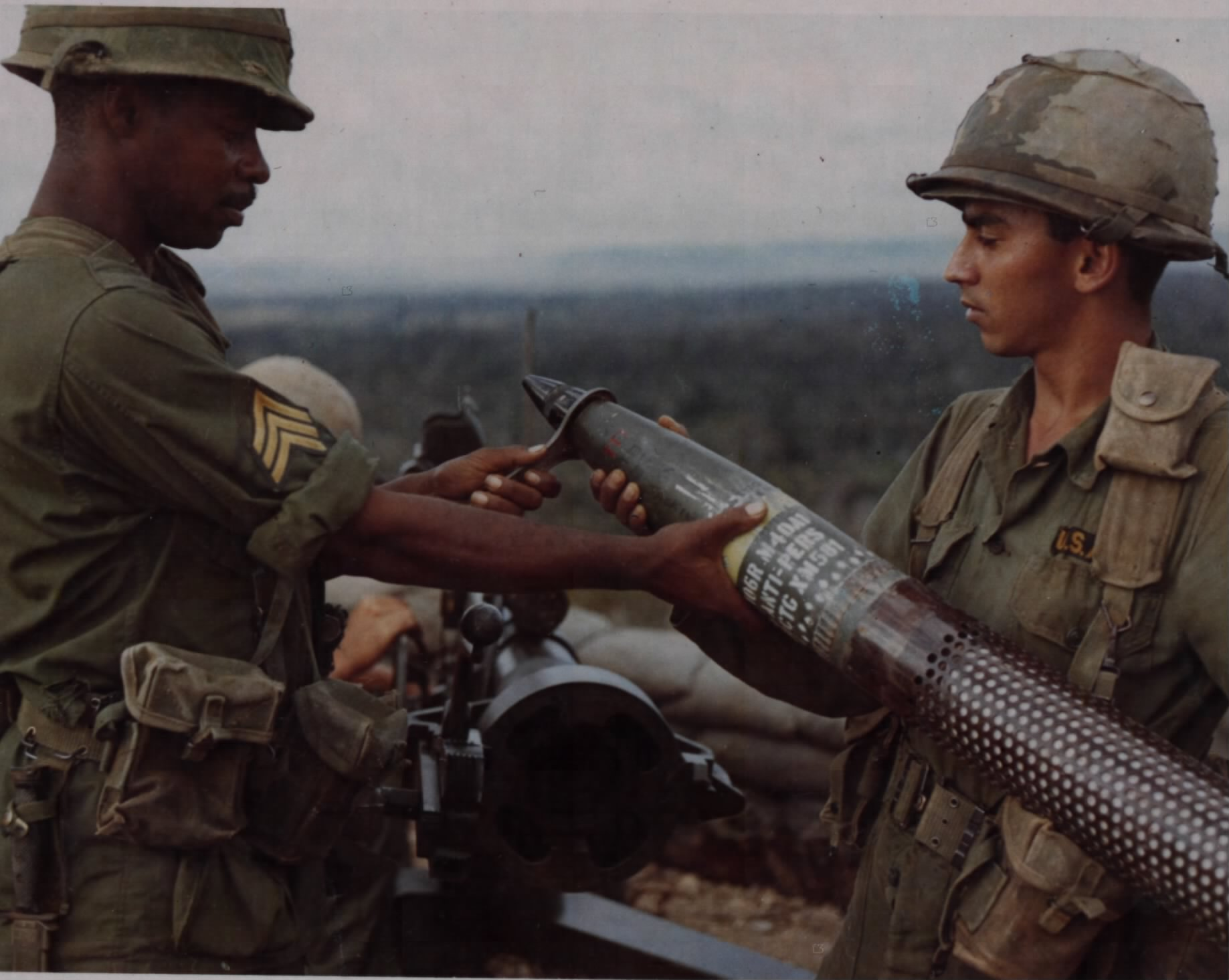
Men of Company "B", 5th Battalion, 7th Cavalry, 1st Cavalry Division (Airmobile) setting the timing on a 106 mm (XM 581) Beehive round, An Khê, 31 January 1967

The 105mm howitzer round was not the only artillery piece provided with APERS-T. Beehive rounds were also created for recoilless anti-tank weapons: the 90 mm and 106 mm mounted on the M50 Ontos. APERS-T rounds were available for 90mm gun on M48 tanks and the 152mm gun on the M551 Sheridan armored reconnaissance/airborne assault vehicle. After the Vietnam War the 105mm tank gun M68 was also provided APER-T ammunition M494. APERS-T rounds in 40×46 mm were also available for the M79, M203, and M320 grenade launchers.

Subsequently, it was reported that the USSR had developed similar rounds for 122 mm and 152 mm artillery for use in indirect fire.

Beehive rounds became less popular in the United States following the Vietnam War, with low-angle air burst techniques such as Killer Junior supplanting the use of Beehive.

== See also ==
- Canister shot (or case-shot)
- Lazy Dog (bomb)
