= Damage (2016 film) =

2016 Ugandan film

- Directed by: Denis Dhikusooka Jr.
- Screenplay by: Denis Dhikusooka Jr.
- Produced by: Denis Dhikusooka Jr.
- Starring: Doreen Rwatooro; Rodney Dhikusooka; Sophia Kemigisha; Samuel Kynes Dhikusooka
- Production company: PEARL Wonders Entertainment
- Release date: 7 December 2016
- Running time: 125 minutes
- Country: Uganda
- Language: English

Damage is a 2016 Ugandan drama film created, written, and directed by Denis Dhikusooka Jr. The film was produced by PEARL Wonders Entertainment and features Doreen Rwatooro and Rodney Dhikusooka in the leading roles. The film explores themes of love, betrayal, and consequences through the story of Martin, a Makerere University student who develops a reputation for manipulating relationships with women until he encounters genuine love that changes his perspective.

== Plot ==
Martin (Rodney Dhikusooka) is an attractive young man studying at Makerere University in Kampala. He has developed a pattern of entering relationships with women purely for entertainment, taking pleasure in manipulating their emotions and then discarding them without consideration for their feelings. This behavior has earned him a reputation as a heartbreaker among his peers and the university community. Martin's cavalier attitude toward relationships changes dramatically when he meets Nicole (Doreen Rwatooro), a woman who challenges his superficial approach to love and romance. For the first time, Martin finds himself genuinely falling in love, experiencing emotions he had previously dismissed or exploited in others. However, Martin's newfound love faces a significant obstacle when Nicole becomes involved in legal troubles that result in her imprisonment. This separation forces Martin to confront the consequences of his past actions and examine the sincerity of his feelings for Nicole. The film explores whether Martin's transformation is genuine or merely another manipulation, and whether love can survive the challenges of separation and personal growth.

== Cast ==
- Doreen Rwatooro as Nicole
- Rodney Dhikusooka as Martin
- Sophia Kemigisha
- Samuel Kynes Dhikusooka

== Production ==
Damage was produced by PEARL Wonders Entertainment, a Ugandan film production company. The film was written and directed by Denis Dhikusooka Jr., who also served as the creator of the project. The production represents part of the growing Ugandan film industry, which has been developing since the early 2000s with increased local production and international recognition. The film was shot in various locations around Uganda, primarily in Kampala, taking advantage of the Makerere University campus and surrounding urban areas to create an authentic university setting.

== See also ==
- Cinema of Uganda
- Makerere University
- List of Ugandan films
