= Lazy Dog (bomb) =

U.S. airdropped kinetic weapon

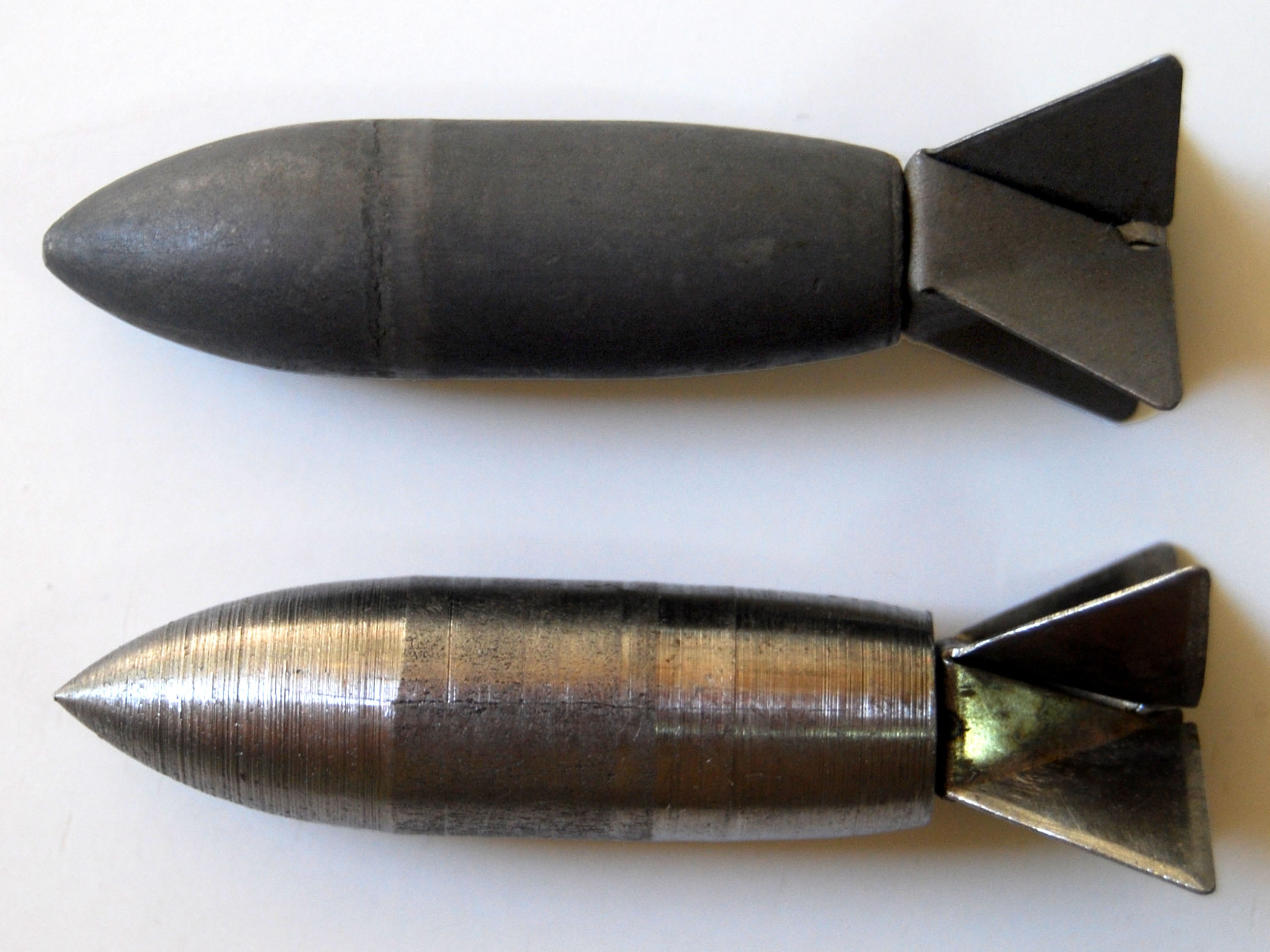
Two designs of the Lazy Dog bomb. (Top: early forged steel design; Bottom: later lathe-turned steel design)

The Lazy Dog (sometimes called a Red Dot Bomb or Yellow Dog Bomb) is a type of small, unguided kinetic projectile used by the U.S. Air Force. It measured about 1.75 inches (44 mm) in length, 0.5 inches (13 mm) in diameter, and weighed about 0.7 ounces (20 g).

The weapons were designed to be dropped from aircraft. They contained no explosive charge but possessed high kinetic energy when dropped from aircraft at high altitude or speed, making them lethal and potentially able to penetrate soft cover such as jungle canopy, several inches of sand, or light armor. Lazy Dog munitions were simple and relatively cheap; they could be dropped in huge numbers in a single pass. Though their effects were often no less deadly than other projectiles, they did not leave unexploded ordnance (UXO) that could be active years after a conflict ended.

Lazy Dog projectiles were used primarily during the Korean and the Vietnam Wars.

== Development ==
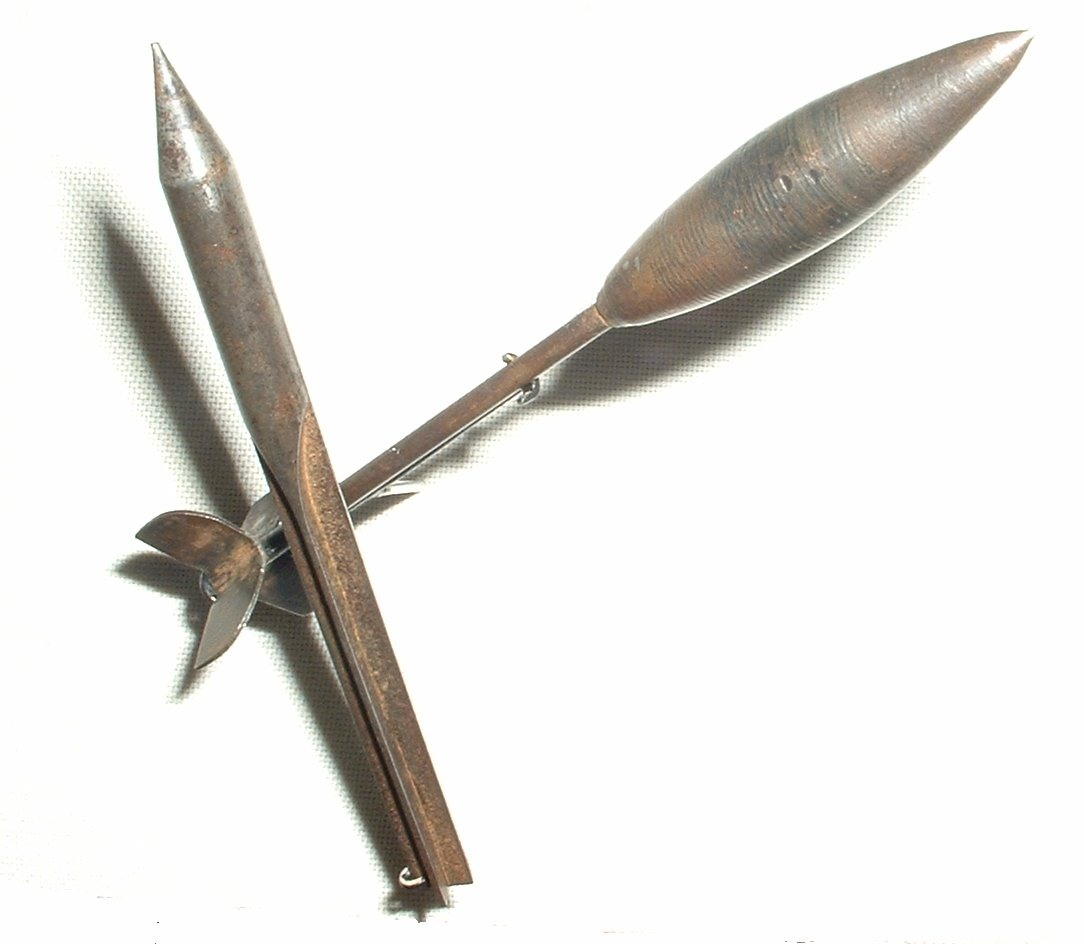
World War I air-dropped flechettes, probably French.

Lazy Dog munitions had precursors in air-dropped flechettes dating from World War I. These flechettes were used as anti-personnel weapons.

Lazy Dogs in their familiar form were descended from projectiles of almost identical design and appearance that were originally developed early in World War II (as early as 1941). The Korean War–era and Vietnam War–era "Lazy Dog" was further developed, tested and deployed into the 1950s and 1960s.

Originally an Armament Laboratory program codenamed Lazy Dog, the weapon's development involved Delco Products Corporation, F&F Mold and Die Works, Inc., Haines Designed Products, and Master Vibrator Company of Dayton. The project objective was to design and test free-fall missiles and their dispensing units for use in bombers and fighters. Lazy Dog anti-personnel missiles were designed to spray enemy troops with small projectiles with three times the force of standard air-burst bombs. The Armament Laboratory worked with the Flight Test Laboratory to conduct wind tunnel tests of a number of bomb shapes which design studies indicated to be the most efficient for storage and release from high performance aircraft.

Experimental Lazy Dog projectiles of various shapes and sizes were tested at Air Proving Ground, Eglin AFB, Florida, in late 1951 and early 1952. An F-84 flying at 400 knots (740 km/h; 460 mph) and 75 feet (23 m) above the ground served as the test bed while a jeep and a B-24 were the targets. The result was eight hits per square yard (approximately nine hits per square metre). Tests revealed Shapes 2 and 5 to be the most effective. Shape 5, an improved basic Lazy Dog slug, had the force of a ".50 calibre bullet" and could penetrate 24 inches (61 cm) of packed sand. Shape 2 could penetrate 12 inches (30 cm) of sand, twice as much as a .45 ACP slug fired point blank.

== Deployment ==
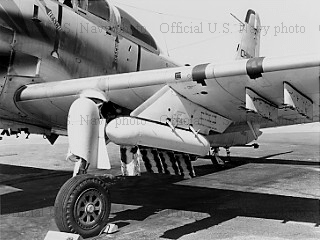
AD-5N Skyraider, BuNo 132521, Lazy Dog dispenser, China Lake, 13 Apr 1961. Official U.S. Navy photo.

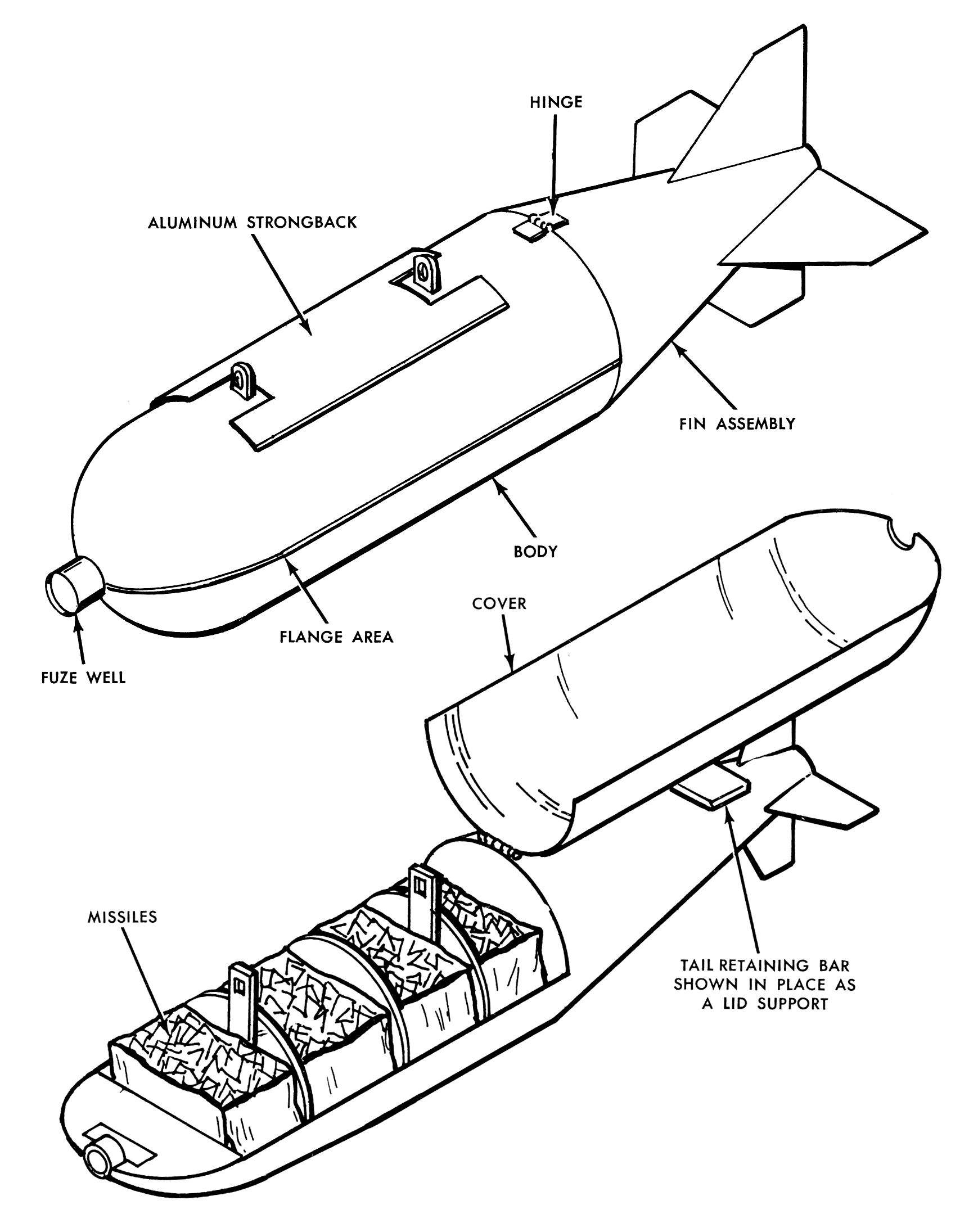
A Mk 44 Lazy Dog cluster adapter.

The Shape 2 projectile was sent to the Far East Air Force for combat use by mid-1952. FEAF immediately ordered 16,000 Lazy Dog weapon systems. The US Air Force Armament Laboratory spent 90 days in Japan establishing local manufacture of the Lazy Dog weapons and training crew members in their use. Project Lazy Dog continued throughout 1952 to determine the optimum characteristics for stable dispersion containers and the feasibility of substituting a Lazy Dog warhead for the explosive nose of the Matador missile. The Lazy Dog program remained ongoing in the late 1950s.

Lazy Dog projectiles could be dropped from almost any kind of flying vehicle. They could be hurled from buckets, dropped by hand, thrown in their small paper shipping bags, or placed in a Mark 44 cluster adaptor—a simple hinged casing with bins built in to hold the projectiles, opened by a mechanical time delay fuze. The adaptors themselves were 69.9 inches (1.78 m) long and 14.18 inches (36.0 cm) in diameter. They would be shipped empty, then filled by hand. Depending on how many projectiles could be packed in, loaded weight varied between 560 and 625 pounds (254 and 283 kg), with the theoretical maximum number of projectiles listed as 17,500.

Depending on how they were released into the air, each "Lazy Dog" projectile could have a significant amount of kinetic energy. In the extreme case of being released at 100 feet (30 m) from a 800 feet per second (240 m/s; 550 mph; 880 km/h) aircraft, they can retain a speed of 710 feet per second (220 m/s; 480 mph; 780 km/h) at time of impact. Alternatively if released at high altitudes over 10,000 feet (3,000 m), the projectile will approach its terminal velocity of around 700 feet per second (210 m/s; 480 mph; 770 km/h).

A variant version of the "Lazy Dog" projectile was developed for the recoilless rifle. Development was suspended because another type of flechette was used for the recoilless rifle.

== See also ==
- Concrete bomb
- Kinetic bombardment

== Bibliography ==
- Karmes, David (2014). The Patricia Lynn Project. ISBN 9781491752272.
- Tagg, Lori S. (2001). "7". On the Front Line of R&D. ASC History Office. Archived from the original on 9 January 2010.
- Pursglove, S David (February 1962). "Bizarre Weapons for the Little Wars". Popular Mechanics. 117 (2). Hearst Magazines: 107–112.
- Eades, J.B.; Powers, C. (1964). Static and Dynamic Stability Studies on Several Lazy Dog Configurations (PDF). U.S. Navy Ordnance Laboratory, White Oak, Maryland. Archived from the original (PDF) on May 2, 2019.
