= Damage Done (disambiguation) =

Damage Done is a 2002 album by Dark Tranquillity.

Damage Done may also refer to:

- Damage Done (novel), a 2010 novel by Hilary Davidson
- "Damage Done", a 2016 song by Kita Alexander

== See also ==
- The Damage Done (disambiguation)
