= Destroy =

Destroy may refer to:

- Destroy (album), a 2004 album by Ektomorf
- Destroy!, a Minneapolis crust punk band
- Destroy!!, a comic book by Scott McCloud

== See also ==
- Destroyer (disambiguation)
- Destruction (disambiguation)
- Destroy 2, a short-lived Japanese noise punk band
