= Damage (American band) =

American hardcore punk band

Damage was an American, New York City-based hardcore band, operating from circa 1983 to 1988.

== Members ==
- Original members, 1983–1985: Boot (Steve Hudecek), Mike Kirkland, Steve McAllister, Denny Morrison, Ted Warner
- Second lineup, 1985–1986: Patrick Blanck, Mike Kirkland, Steve McAllister, Denny Morrison, Ted Warner
- Third lineup, 1987–1988: Steve McAllister, Sean McDonough, Virgil Moorefield, Denny Morrison, Ted Warner

== Discography ==
=== Albums ===
- Sins of Our Fathers (Gnarl) – 1984
- Recorded Live Off the Board at CBGB (Celluloid) – 1986

=== Compilation albums ===
- Mutiny on the Bowery (Mystic Records) – 1986
- There's a Method to Our Madness (Phantom Records) – 1986
- Recorded Live Off the Board at CBGB (CBGB / Off the Board Records) – 1987
