= Somatic damage =

Somatic damage may refer to any of the health effects of radiation other than teratogenesis, including

- Acute radiation syndrome
- Radiation burns
- Radiation-induced cancer
- Radiation-induced heart disease
- Radiation-induced lung injury
- Radiation-induced thyroiditis
- Radiation induced cognitive decline
