= The Damage (song) =

"The Damage (Live)"

Single by Marillion

from the album Marbles Live, Marbles (original version)
- Released: 2005
- Recorded: July 2004, London Astoria
- Genre: Pop rock
- Length: 4:05
- Label: Intact Records
- Songwriter(s): Steve Hogarth, Steve Rothery, Mark Kelly, Pete Trewavas, Ian Mosley
- Producer(s): Michael Hunter

Marillion singles chronology
"Don't Hurt Yourself" (2004)	"The Damage (Live)" (2005)	"See It Like a Baby" (2007)

"The Damage" is a song by British neo-prog band Marillion which appeared on their 13th studio album, Marbles, released in May 2004. In October 2005, a one-disc live album containing a subset of the full two-disc studio version entitled Marbles Live was released to retail shops in the UK. The recording was made at the London Astoria in July 2004. To promote this album, the track "The Damage" was made available as a digital download; it is thus the third song to be released from Marbles and the only track to be released from Marbles Live. Download-only releases were not yet eligible to chart on the UK Singles Chart at the time, but the single did reach #2 on the UK Official Download Chart. There was no physical release available, but a one-track CD version was sent out as a promo (source of cover art).

== Track list ==
1. "The Damage" (live) – 4:05

== Personnel ==
- Steve Hogarth – vocals
- Mark Kelly – keyboards
- Ian Mosley – drums
- Steve Rothery – guitar
- Pete Trewavas – bass guitar

== Chart positions ==
Chart (2004)	Peak position
UK Official Download Chart	2
