= Damaged (web series) =

American animated web series

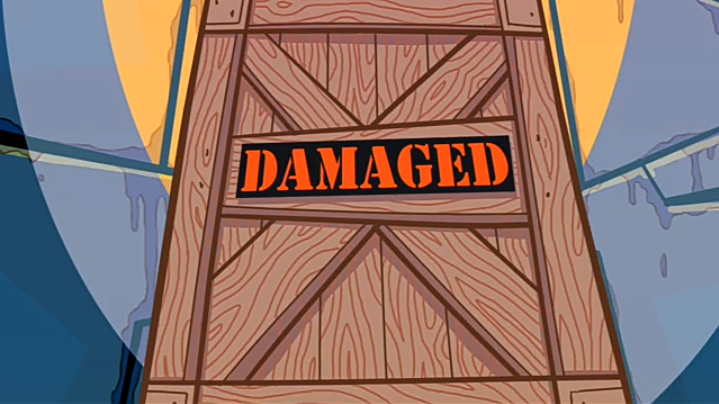
- Genre: Animated series
- Created by: Liz Miele
- Written by: Liz Miele
- Directed by: Liz Miele
- Voices of: Liz Miele; RG Daniels
- Theme music composer: Ben Luce
- Ending theme: "Adopted Me" by Emily Miele
- Composers: Ben Luce; Dan Michael Reyes
- Country of origin: United States
- Original language: English
- No. of episodes: 12

Production
- Executive producers: Terry Miele; James Scott Blanton
- Producer: Liz Miele
- Running time: 1–3 minutes
- Production company: Evil Kitty Productions

Original release
- Network: YouTube
- Release: June 28, 2013 – July 21, 2014

Damaged is an American animated web series created by Liz Miele, it aired on YouTube in 2013.

== Premise ==
Damaged follows two broken robots named Emily and TJ, who were adopted by couple Richard and Rebecca, who struggle to deal with their unique needs.

== Voice cast ==
=== Main ===
- Liz Miele as Emily
- RG Daniels as TJ

=== Minor ===
- Ben Luce as Customer
- Grant Lindahi as Bully / Guitar
- TJ Del Reno as Cool Kid
- Emily Miele as Dillonettes

== Episodes ==
No.	Title	Original release date
1	"Adopted"	June 28, 2013
On the way in School, two robots name Emily and TJ who live in future, inhabited by humans and robots. When Emily found out she was adopted.
2	"Dillon"	June 28, 2013
When school student name Dillon, who becomes popular among students. But TJ dont understand what popular was.
3	"Recycling Day"	June 28, 2013
4	"Initial Confusion"	July 1, 2013
5	"Raising Robots"	August 6, 2013
6	"Altitude Adjustment"	September 3, 2013
7	"Up in Arms"	October 7, 2013
8	"One of Us"	November 22, 2013
9	"Babysitters"	January 5, 2014
10	"With a Little Help from My Friends"	February 4, 2014
11	"The Maker's Mark"	April 12, 2014
12	"Happy Fun Time"	July 21, 2014
