= Damage =

Change in a thing that degrades it away from its initial state

Damage is any change in a thing, often a physical object, that degrades it away from its initial state. It can broadly be defined as "changes introduced into a system that adversely affect its current or future performance". Damage "does not necessarily imply total loss of system functionality, but rather that the system is no longer operating in its optimal manner". Damage to physical objects is "the progressive physical process by which they break" and includes mechanical stress that weakens a structure, even if this is not visible. Efforts undertaken to prevent or ameliorate damage are often referred to as "damage control".

== Physical damage ==
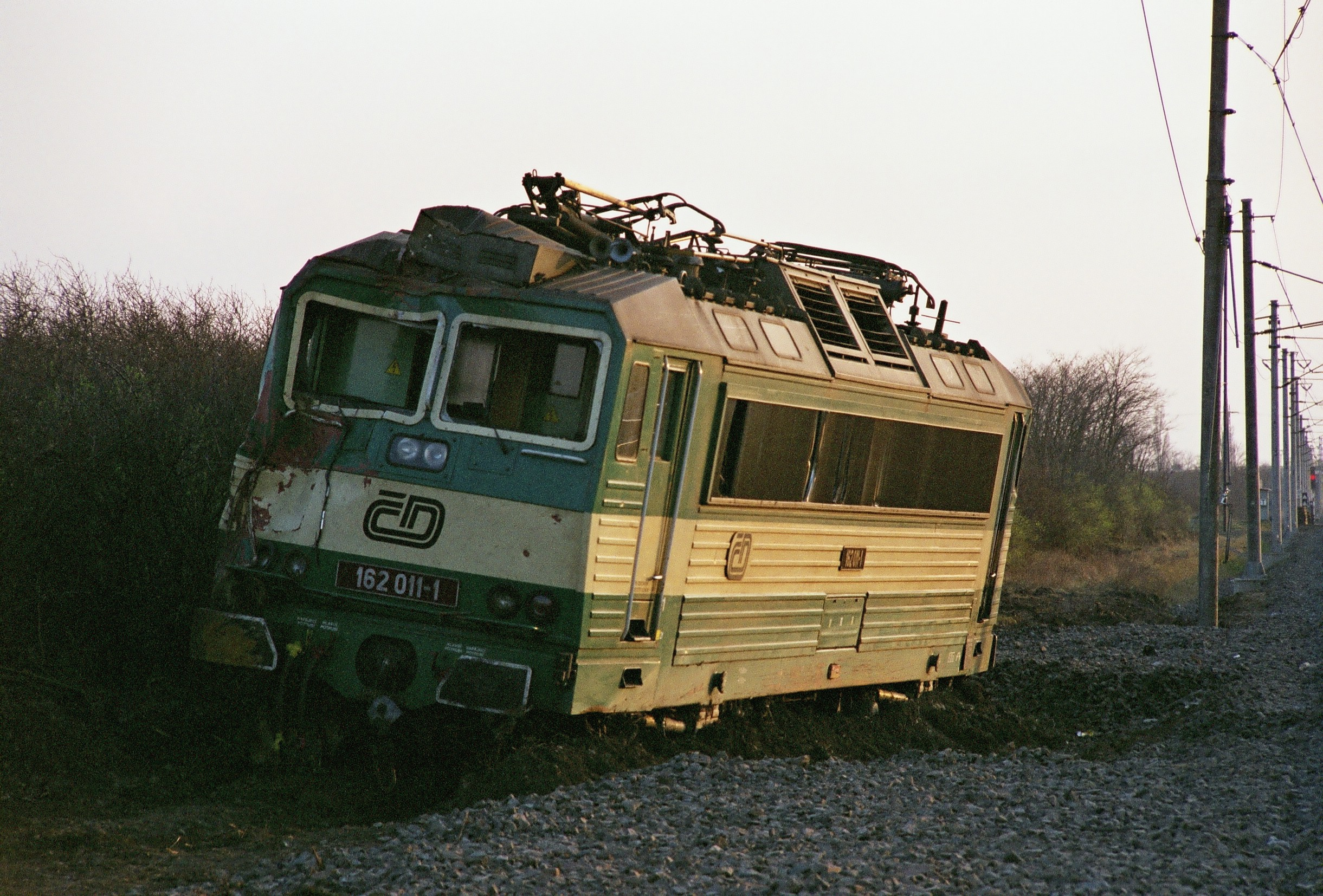
Damage to an electric locomotive in Vraňany caused by a car crash

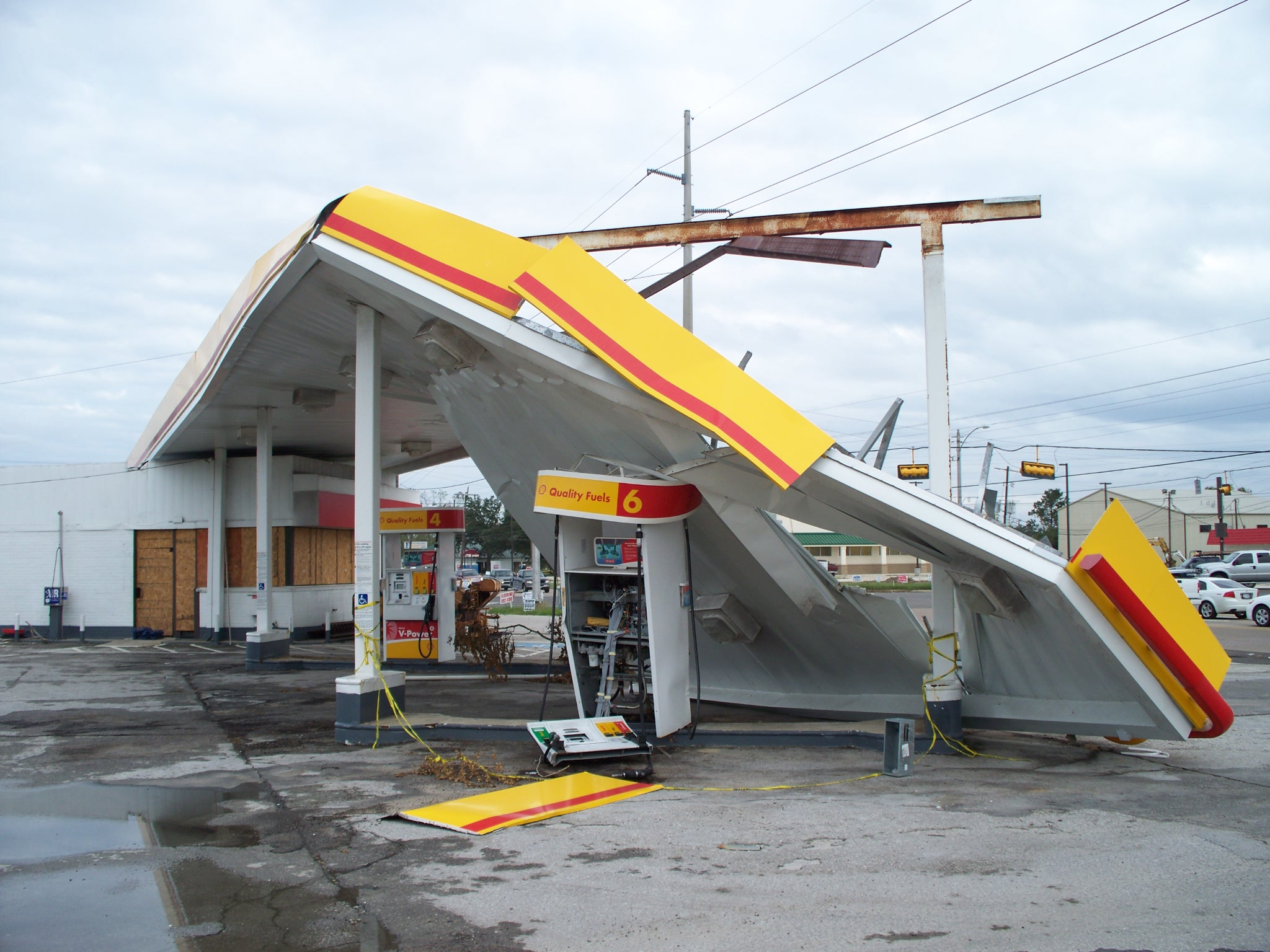
Damage to a gas station in Texas caused by a hurricane

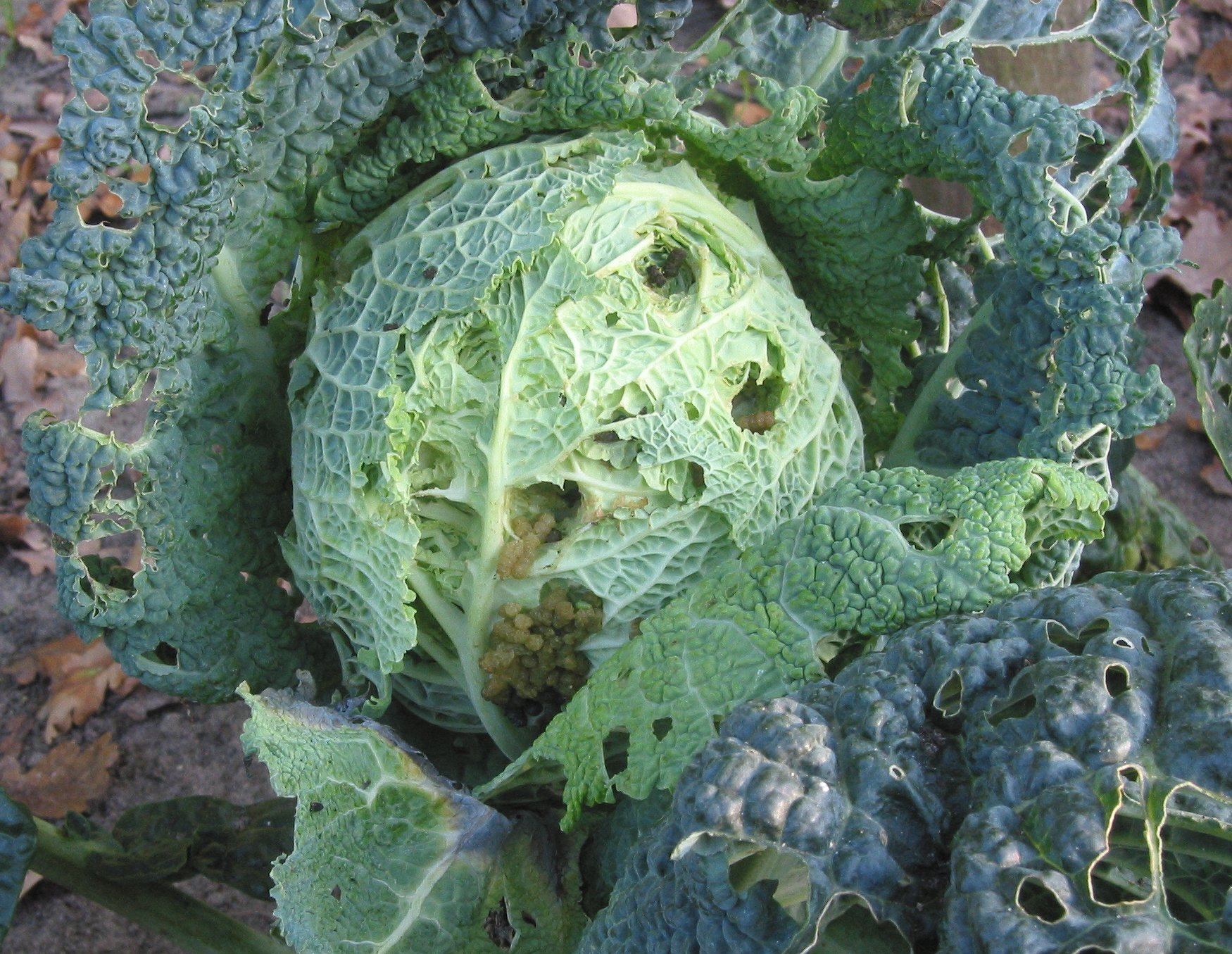
Damage to cabbage leaves caused by insects

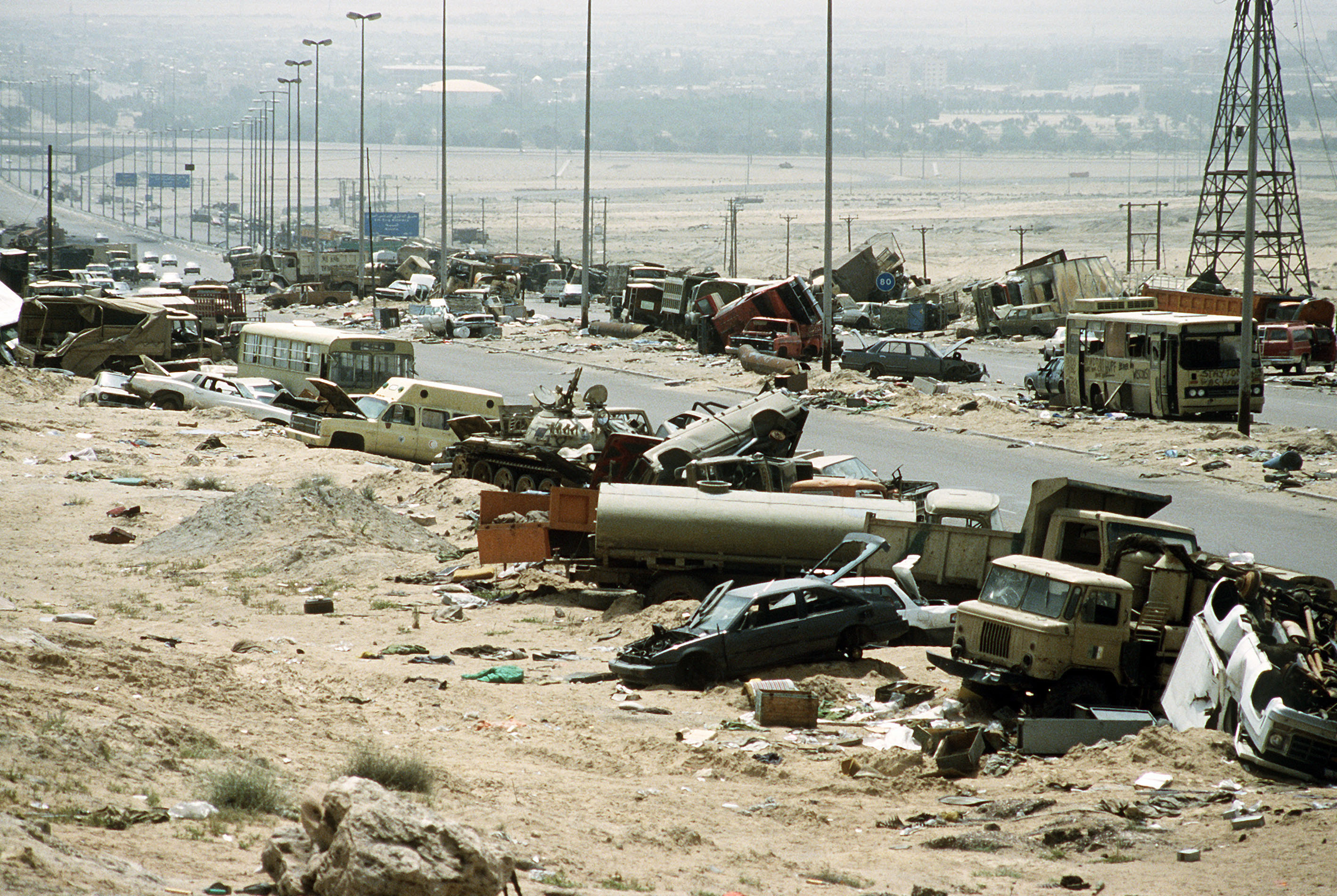
Damage caused by military action in the Gulf War

All physical damage begins on the atomic level, with the shifting or breaking of atomic bonds, and the rate at which damage to any physical thing occurs is therefore largely dependent on the elasticity of such bonds in the material being subjected to stress. Damage can occur where atomic bonds are not completely broken but are shifted to create unstable pockets of concentration and diffusion of the material, which are more susceptible to later breakage. The effect of outside forces on a material depends on the relative elasticity or plasticity of the material; if a material tends towards elasticity, then changes to its consistency are reversible, and it can bounce back from potential damage. However, if the material tends towards plasticity, then such changes are permanent, and each such change increases the possibility of a crack or fault appearing in the material.

Although all damage at the atomic level manifests as broken atomic bonds, the manifestation of damage at the macroscopic level depends on the material and can include cracks and deformation, as well as structural weakening that is not visible.

=== To objects ===
Damage to structures and other objects can take several forms, such as fire damage caused by the effects of burning, water damage done by water to materials not resistant to its effects, and radiation damage due to ionizing radiation. Some kinds of damage are specific to vehicles and mechanical or electronic systems, such as foreign object damage caused by the presence of any foreign substance, debris, or article; hydrogen damage caused by interactions between metals and hydrogen; and damage mechanics, which includes damage to materials due to cyclic mechanical loads. When an object has been damaged, it may be possible to repair the object, thereby restoring it to its original condition or to a new condition that allows it to function despite the damage.

Damage can be intentional or accidental. When an object or building is deliberately damaged, the act can be socially significant as a way to degrade the meaning of the object. Though things can have multiple meanings, in circumstances where they are deliberately damaged one meaning—which prompts the act—takes precedence.

=== To living organisms ===
Damage to a living organism may be referred to as an injury. The kinds of damage experienced by living things range from microscopic DNA damage and indirect DNA damage, and cell damage in a biological cell, to damage to larger systems such as nerve damage, brain damage, and articular cartilage damage. Damage to the body on a larger scale is often referred to as trauma. Ageing is accompanied by a loss of ability to recover quickly from various kinds of biological damage. Damage is one of two factors proposed to influence biological ageing (the other being programmed factors follow a biological timetable). Damage-related factors include internal and environmental assaults to living organisms that induce cumulative damage at various levels.

== Other concepts ==
Damage that occurs as an unintended consequence of an effort to cause intentional damage elsewhere, such as with a military operation, is called collateral damage, while damage specifically done to public or private property is called property damage. By extension, damage is also used to describe a degradation in the value of intangible things such as relationships, self-image, reputation, and goodwill.

=== Economics ===
The propensity for damage to occur to physical objects and systems, as well as to intangible characteristics, is built into the prices of goods and services that depend on the supply of these things, particularly as a component of insurance costs. In common law, damages are the award, typically of money, to be paid to a person as compensation for loss or injury (i.e., economic or physical damage).

=== Institutional damage ===
Institutional damage is broadly defined as unintended consequences to an individual resulting from interaction with an institution which has responsibility for his or her care. The individual might be a hospital patient, a child in a school, or a prison inmate. Some forms of institutional damage, such as medical errors and hospital-acquired infection, are relatively easily measured; others, such as long-term damage to development and mental health are significantly harder to measure. There is controversy as to whether such damage can be measured and if it actually occurs.

It is not a widely used term, however, but it is a legal concept of considerable importance, because it is extremely common, particularly in countries where human rights of prisoners and other people under institutional care are not respected or guaranteed by law.

Constitutional law, civil law (common law) and criminal law codices have many provisions to protect individuals against injuries caused by institutions to which they are unwillingly committed. The extent and the respect to these laws vary widely among countries and communities. These controversies relate to the old government versus individual debate which has permeated philosophy and political science since Ancient Greece.

=== Damage to institutions ===
The same expression is also used in the opposite sense, i.e., as damage caused to institutions, as opposed to damage caused to individuals. For example, political exception situations, such as the suspension of political rights for a time, are said to damage democratic institutions. Other examples are vandalism of public buildings, extremely large epidemics that disrupt normal functioning of society's institutions, such as in the case of AIDS in Africa; external military intervention, such as in the invasion of Iraq by the U.S. and allied nations; and even (paradoxically), external aid to countries which are rich in natural resources but have a poor economy and/or corrupt government (the so-called "resource curse")

The two concepts, damage caused by institutions and damage caused to institutions, are related in many situations. In widespread political trials ("witch hunting") in democratic countries, such as in the famous House Committee on Un-American Activities in the 1940s, damage was said to occur in both directions, i.e., not only the lives, families and professional activities of a number of individuals were wrecked by the public exposure, but also the political institutions of individual rights and freedom in the United States were also similarly damaged by the Committee's activities.

== See also ==
- Death
- Deformation (mechanics)
- Degradation
