= Degradation =

Degradation may refer to:

== Science ==
- Biodegradation of organic substances by living organisms
- Decomposition (disambiguation)
- Degradation (geology), lowering of a fluvial surface by erosion
- Degradation (telecommunications), of an electronic signal
- Environmental degradation in ecology
- Land degradation, a process in which the value of the biophysical environment is affected by a combination of human-induced processes acting upon the land
- Polymer degradation, loss of merit as plastics age
- Protein degradation, a metabolic process

== Other ==
- Cashiering, whereby a military officer is dismissed for misconduct
- "Degradation", a song by the Violent Femmes from Add It Up (1981–1993)
- Degradation, the former ceremony of defrocking a disgraced priest
- Degradation (knighthood), revocation of knighthood
- Elegant degradation, gradual rather than sudden
- Graceful degradation, in a fault-tolerant system
- Reduction in rank, whereby a military officer is reduced to a lower rank for misconduct

== See also ==
- Dégradé, 2015 Palestinian film
- Cruel, inhuman or degrading treatment
- Humiliation
