= Lawrence Pellet Primer System =

The Lawrence Pellet Primer System was a development of the Sharps rifle, which was discontinued in 1863.

The system was designed to mechanically place the primer which ignites the black powder of the rifle. This feature was to be used when a high rate of fire was needed, or when the weather was too cold to manually place individual primers on the firearm.
