= LIGHT Program =

The Laser Ignition in Guns, Howitzers and Tanks (LIGHT) Program began in the early 1990s at the Ballistic Research Laboratory (BRL), which later became a part of the U.S Army Research Laboratory (ARL). This program was designed to create laser ignition systems to replace the igniters in guns and artillery. Between 1993 and 1999, ARL did extensive research on laser ignition testing of solid propellants. During this time, the research conducted was a part of the LIGHT program.

The main motivation of this research program was the efficiency of laser ignition systems and to eliminate all primers and igniter materials from the ignition train. The LIGHT program was stimulated by the potential for reducing the vulnerability of primers and igniters in the ignition train and allowing for the ignition of insensitive mutations.

LIGHT aimed to understand the chemical and physical interactions of lasers with energetic materials, such as propellants. Within the program, ignition has been categorized into two regimes, direct and indirect laser-based ignition. The direct laser ignition concept focuses on initiation of propellant beds by the interaction of laser light with a charge. On the other hand, indirect laser ignition involves the removal of current primers and igniter material from the ignition train in their configurations within the munition. However, both of these ignition concepts involve the transfer of laser radiation into the gun through the use of optical fibers connected through a breech window.

As part of the LIGHT program, laser beam parameters, such as pulse width, wavelength, duration, energy, and repetition rate were studied for ignition of energetic materials. These materials include black powder, nitrocellulose, and M44 propellant. The LIGHT program used glass lasers based on small size, low cost, and reliability to ignite propellants materials. Based on early experiment testing, a modified laser ignition chamber was designed to enable the measurement of pressure-time traces for different types of insensitive and non-conventional energetic.
