= Daisy V/L =

- Type: Single-shot rifle
- Place of origin: United States

Production history
- Designer: Jules Van Langenhoven
- Designed: 1961
- Manufacturer: Daisy Outdoor Products
- Produced: 1968–1969
- No. built: 23,000

Specifications
- Cartridge: .22 caliber, caseless round
- Cartridge weight: 29 grains (1.9 g) bullet
- Caliber: .22 in (5.6 mm)
- Action: Compressed air to ignite cartridge
- Muzzle velocity: 1,150 feet per second (350 m/s)
- Feed system: Single shot
- Sights: Front post, rear leaf sight

The Daisy V/L was the first production rifle for caseless ammunition. It was released in 1968 by Daisy Outdoor Products.

In 1961, Cass Hough, the president of Daisy Heddon division of Victor Comptometer, purchased the design of a new firearm system. The new system was developed by a Belgian chemist named Jules Van Langenhover. The new gun would be known as the Daisy V/L rifle.

The Daisy V/L ammunition consisted of a .22 caliber bullet with a small cylinder of propellant on the back, and no primer. The rifle resembled a typical spring-air rifle, but the 2,000 °F (1,090 °C) high-pressure air served not only to propel the projectile, but also to ignite the propellant on the back of the Daisy V/L cartridge. The rifle uses a small, unique, and well designed part called an Obturator (obturator/ignitor) to compress the air as it is pushed through a tiny hole. This air is heated as it is pushed through the small hole enough to ignite the powder of the caseless round.

The Daisy V/L rifles and ammunition were discontinued in 1969 after the US Bureau of Alcohol, Tobacco, Firearms and Explosives ruled that they constituted a firearm, and Daisy, which was not licensed to manufacture firearms, decided to discontinue manufacture rather than become a firearms manufacturer. About 23,000 of the rifles were made before production ceased.

The Daisy V/L rifle and ammunition has been added to the ATF Curio & Relic list.

== See also ==
- Voere VEC-91
