= Voere =

Austrian firearm manufacturing company

- Company type: Private
- Industry: firearms
- Predecessor: Koma in West Germany
- Founded: 1948 in West Germany
- Headquarters: Kufstein (Tyrol), Austria
- Products: Military rifles, hunting rifles, air pistols
- Website: voere.com

Voere is an Austrian firearm manufacturing company best known for its VEC-91 bolt-action rifle using caseless ammunition.

The origins of the company date back to the 1948 establishment of the metal-working company Koma in West Germany. Originally producing bicycle pumps, the company branched out into the production of air pistols in 1950. In 1955, Koma was renamed Voere. The company's name is a combination of the founders' names: Voetter and Restle. That year, Voere began the production of small-bore rifles.

In 1965, the company relocated to a new factory in Kufstein, Austria. In 1972, licensed production of the American-180 submachine gun began. By 1980, the company began to diversify its production, and included a new line of environmental/horticultural products. In 1989, Voere merged with the trading company Kufsteiner Gerätebau und Handelsges m.b.H and formed Voere-KGH m.b.H. At that time, Voere began work as a precision machining subcontractor for other companies. The VEC-91 caseless rifle was introduced in 1991.
