= Voere VEC-91 =

VEC-91
- Type: Bolt-action rifle
- Place of origin: Austria

Production history
- Designer: Voere
- Manufacturer: Voere
- Produced: 1991

Specifications
- Mass: 3.2 kilograms (7.1 lb)
- Length: 1,000 millimetres (39 in)
- Barrel length: 520 millimetres (20 in)
- Cartridge: 5.56 millimetres (0.219 in); 5.7 millimetres (0.22 in); 6 millimetres (0.24 in) UCC (Usel Caseless Cartridge)
- Action: Bolt-action
- Muzzle velocity: 930 metres per second (3,100 ft/s)
- Feed system: 4- or 5-round magazine

The Voere VEC-91 is a rifle made by Voere and was the first commercial sporting rifle to combine caseless ammunition and electronic firing. Depending on the cartridge that was chambered for, it could fire either a 5.56 millimetres (0.219 in), 5.7 millimetres (0.22 in), or 6 millimetres (0.24 in) projectile at muzzle velocities at up to 930 metres per second (3,100 ft/s). The rifle was first exported to the United States in 1993, but was not a commercial success.

== Design ==
Caseless ammunition has been a popular military rifle concept since the end of World War II, but has never met with public approval due to its sole source nature (and it cannot be handloaded at home). The main benefits of caseless ammunition to the military are that ammunition can be made lighter, enabling soldiers to carry several hundred rounds, and the fact that case extraction is not required allows a faster automatic rate of fire, both of which are immaterial to the needs of the typical civilian shooter or hunter, who rarely wants to carry hundreds of rounds of ammunition, or is allowed to own a semi-automatic firearm and/or automatic firearm. Voere attempted to introduce caseless ammunition to civilian shooters in 1991 with the VEC-91.

When the rifle was chambered for either the 5.56 millimetres (0.219 in) cartridge or 5.7 millimetres (0.22 in) cartridge it used a 5-round magazine and when chambered for the 6 millimetres (0.24 in) cartridge it used a 4-round magazine. Two 15-volt dry cell batteries, located in the pistol grip, allowed it to fire approximately 5,000 rounds before the batteries needed to be replaced.

The bolt contained no firing pin or striker, just a ceramic cap that would electronically detonate the primer via the battery charge. The cartridge was designed by Hubert Usel and is known as the Usel Caseless Cartridge (UCC). The round was encased in a block of solid nitrocellulose and because it was not an automatic rifle it did not have the problems with cooking-off that plagued earlier military attempts such as the Heckler & Koch G11, in which the built up heat of sustained fire caused rounds to detonate immediately upon entering the chamber, releasing more heat, and often resulting in an uncontrollable burst of automatic fire until the magazine was emptied (although this is a risk in normal metallic cartridge firearms as well).

The Voere VEC-91 was capable of great accuracy due to several factors inherent to the design and several factors due to its implementation. First, the trigger activated a button, requiring little pressure. Second, the electronic ignition meant that there was no latency due to lock time, the firing sequence was almost instantaneous. Lastly, all ammunition came from one source, with the result that all rounds were identical within manufacturing tolerances.

Voere built the rifle with a walnut stock in the Monte-Carlo design with a high cheek rest, schnabel forend, checkered grip and sling swivels intended for the hunting market. The trigger was adjustable from 0.5 to 5 pounds (0.23 to 2.27 kg). The barrel was 20 inches (510 mm) in length and the rifle was 39 inches (990 mm) in overall length.

The proprietary nature of the rifle's caseless ammunition and supply chain problems prevented it from being successful in the United States, but Voere still produced the rifle for the European market, as late as 2007.

== See also ==
- Daisy V/L
