= Daisy Outdoor Products =

Air gun manufacturer

- Type: Private
- Predecessor: Daisy Manufacturing Company
- Founded: Plymouth, Michigan (1882; 144 years ago)
- Founder: Clarence Hamilton
- Headquarters: Rogers, Arkansas, United States
- Area served: Worldwide
- Products: air guns
- Owner: Bruckmann, Rosser, Sherrill & Co.
- Website: www.daisy.com

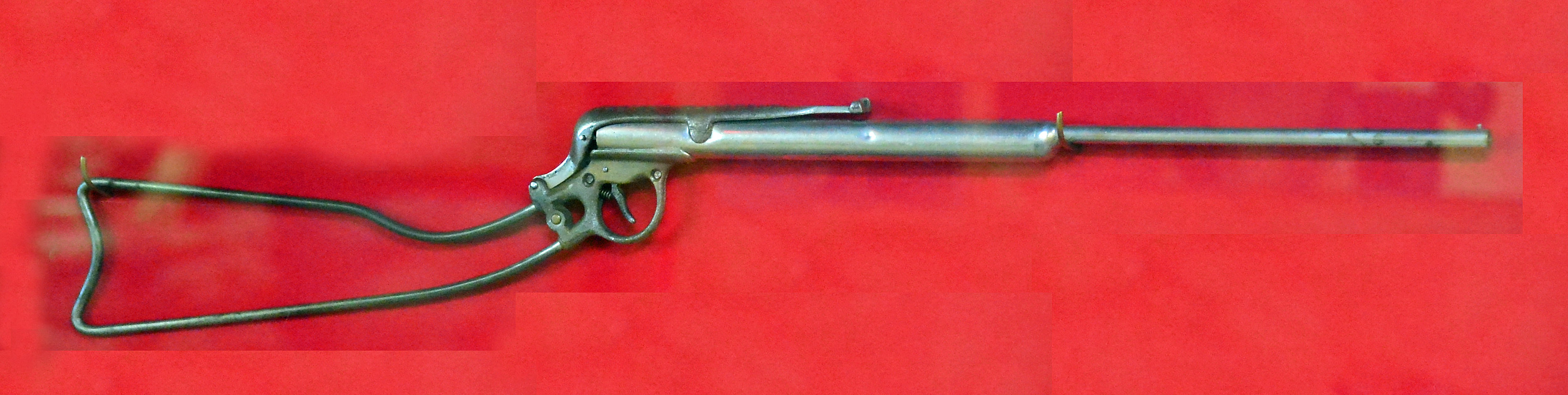
First Daisy air rifle, built 1889 by Plymouth Iron Windmill Company, on display at the National BB Gun Museum in Branson, Missouri.

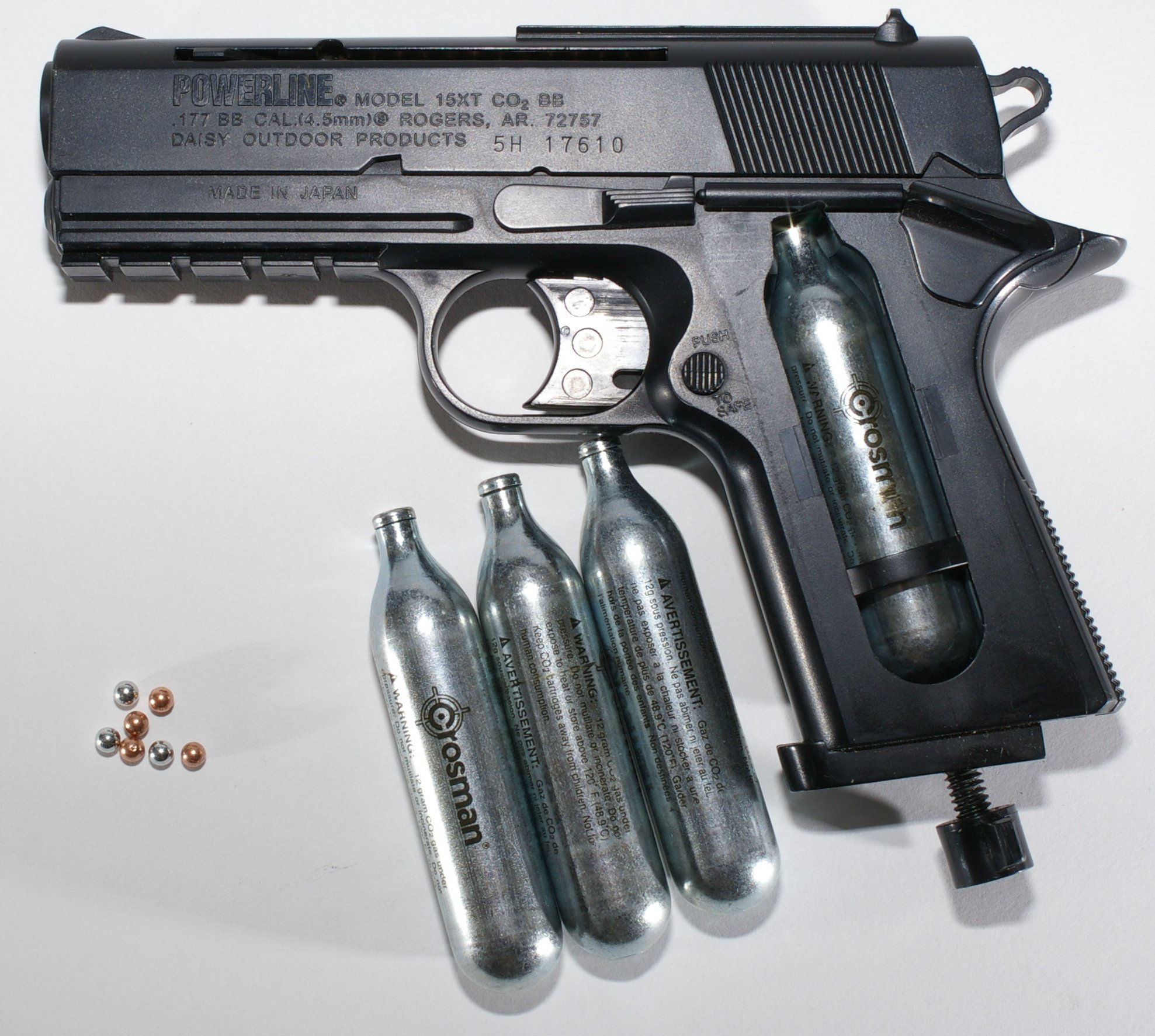
Daisy BB gun with CO_{2} and BBs

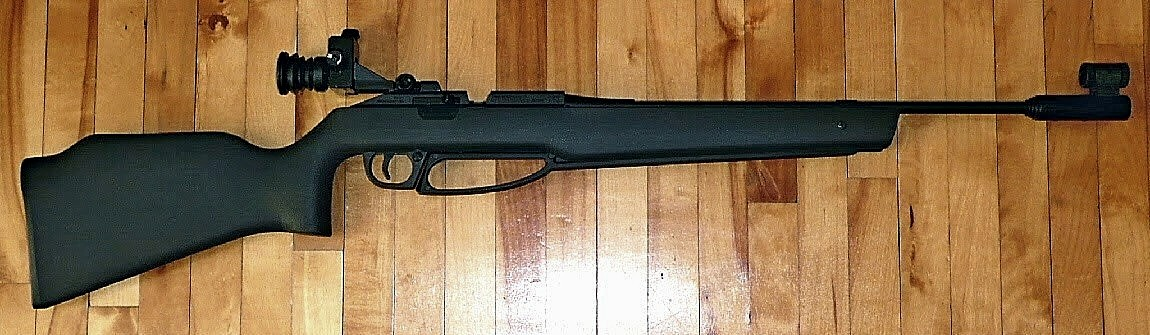
Daisy Avanti 753S Elite air rifle (.177 pellet caliber)

Daisy Outdoor Products (known primarily as Daisy) is an American airgun manufacturer known particularly for their lines of BB guns. It was formed in 1882 initially as the Plymouth Iron Windmill Company in Plymouth, Michigan, to manufacture steel windmills, and from 1888 started bundling BB-caliber air guns with each windmill purchase as a sales promotion. With the unrivaled popularity of their 1888-model Daisy BB Guns, the company changed the name to Daisy Manufacturing Company in 1895 and switched their business to solely producing air guns for sale. Throughout the 20th century, Daisy has been known as a company that makes and sells BB guns and pellet youth rifles. Their Red Ryder BB Gun is perhaps the best known and longest production item, which has been featured in many TV shows and movies since its introduction in the spring of 1940.

== History ==
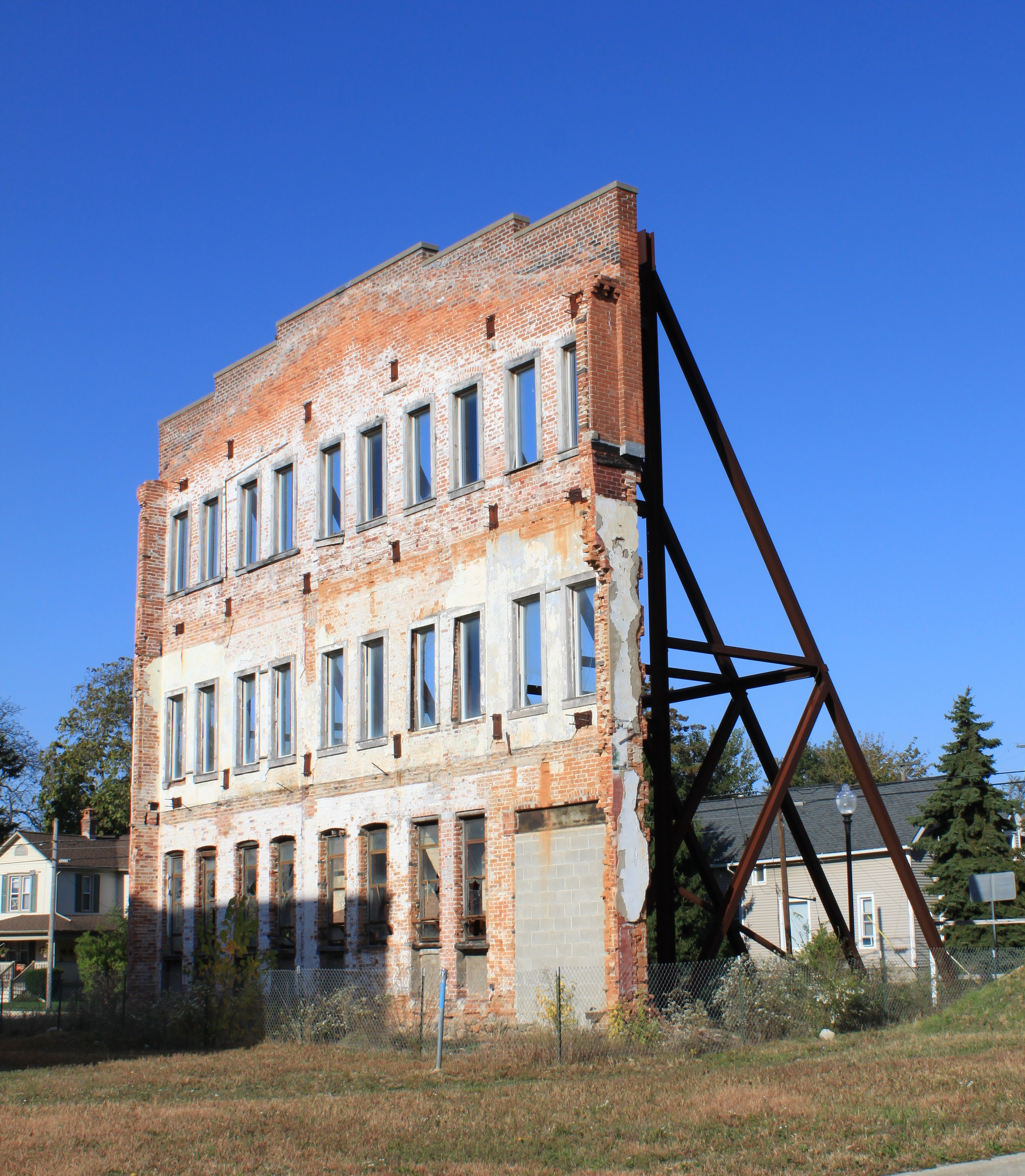
Daisy factory wall

The company started in 1882 by watchmaker and inventor Clarence Hamilton in Plymouth, Michigan, as the Plymouth Iron Windmill Company, to manufacture a type of vaneless windmills that Hamilton invented in 1880. By the mid-1880s the business was struggling, as transporting the heavy steel windmills by wagons throughout the southern part of Michigan, northern Indiana, and throughout Ohio was impractical. In January 1888 the company board met to consider closing the factory, but the motion to liquidate failed by one vote — that of general manager Lewis Cass Hough.

Around the corner from the windmill company, Hamilton also operated the Plymouth Air Rifle Company, to compete with the Markham "Challenger" — a new type of wooden spring-powered airgun shooting BB-size round shot invented by Captain William F. Markham (though some argued that the real inventor was George W. Sage) in 1886 — manufactured by the Markham Air Rifle Company just across the Chesapeake and Ohio Railway. On March 6, 1888, Hamilton approached the windmill company board with an all-metal airgun design of his own and sought to use the factory blast furnaces to mold and stamp the metal parts necessary to build his gun. General manager Lewis Hough test fired the gun and exclaimed, "Boy, it's a daisy!", and the new gun was named the "Daisy BB Gun". The board of the Windmill Company then decided to offer the gun as a bundled premium item to every farmer who purchased a windmill.

This began many years of intense competition between Plymouth and Markham, who responded by introducing their metal "Chicago" (1888) and "King" (1890) model BB guns. However, Plymouth's marketing strategy was much better, as by 1900, 15% of their sales revenue was being spent on posters and magazines space, with the net result of such intensive promotion being to make Daisy virtually a household word, while Markham paid little effort on advertising. The Daisy BB Guns continued to outsell its competitors, and by 1895 its sales and popularity had grown to the point that the Plymouth Company ceased the manufacture of windmills, began producing airguns exclusively, and the board voted to change the company name to Daisy Manufacturing Company.

In 1901, Daisy introduced a 500-shot lever-action rifle (predating Markham's by nine years), and special guns were even built to shoot streams of water at Masonic initiations. Perhaps the most famous model was the Little Daisy, Model 20, which was made continuously with only three model changes between 1908 and 1937 and at times sold for less than fifty cents. Daisy's continued market lead eventually led the Markham management to give up competing and quietly sold out to two Daisy executives in 1916, and Captain Markham himself moved to California. The acquired Markham Company changed its name to King Air Rifle Company in 1928, and continued to manufacture the Markham "King" Model air rifle until 1935, before ceasing operation all together in the 1940s.

In 1958, the company moved the corporate offices and manufacturing facilities from Plymouth to Rogers, Arkansas.

In 1993, Daisy was acquired by the private equity firm Charter Oak Partners. The Plymouth factory was demolished in 2005 and replaced with a condominium complex called Daisy Square. One wall of the factory building remained in front of the complex until its demolition on November 18, 2013. The wall had been free-standing since the factory was torn down, and was supposed to be built into an apartment building, but the wall was not included in the completed building. The Daisy Administration building, on Main Street, is still standing and has become an office complex and restaurant. In 2016, Daisy was sold by Charter Oak to another private equity firm, Bruckmann, Rosser, Sherrill & Co., who combined it with Gamo Outdoor.

== Production ==
Daisy is best known for their inexpensive youth BB guns, modeled after lever-action rifles. Perhaps the most famous of these is the Red Ryder model, which is still in production today, despite the fact that the Red Ryder comic strip was canceled in 1963. These simple smoothbore, spring-air BB guns fire at low velocities, and are marketed to children ages 10 and over. In addition to the spring air BB guns, Daisy also markets a line of multi-pump pneumatic rifles capable of firing pellets or BBs to the same age group.

Production of the Daisy Model 25 was restarted in 2009. Featuring a spring feed mechanism and modeled after a pump-action shotgun with pumped cocking, the Model 25 dominated the low-price, higher-performance airgun market for over 50 years (1914–1978).

The Powerline models are Daisy's more powerful, more accurate line of airguns, marketed to ages 16 and up. The Powerline rifles include multi-pump pneumatics and spring-piston break barrels, have rifled barrels designed for shooting pellets, and are capable of greater velocities than Daisy's Youth Rifles. Powerline pistols are multishot double-action designs, powered by CO_{2} powerlets or spring pistons. BB models are smoothbore, while pellet models have rifled barrels. These are styled to resemble firearms, and are often used by adults in place of firearms for inexpensive training and practice, or in jurisdictions where firearms are heavily restricted or prohibited.

The Avanti line consists of Daisy's target guns. Some of the Avanti line are pellet guns, either single-stroke pneumatic or CO_{2}-powered, with high-quality sights and built to much higher standards. Some models use barrels from Lothar Walther, a top European barrel maker. Even the least expensive Avanti model, the 717 pistol, has been used by world championship 10 m Air Pistol shooter Don Nygord to shoot a medal-winning round in a California state championship. The Cadets and Junior Canadian Rangers adopted the Daisy/ Avanti model 853C target rifle for their cadet program's marksmanship training program, as well as competitive 10m target shooting.

Daisy also makes, as part of the Avanti line, the Model 499B Champion, billed as the "world's most accurate BB gun". This is a true competition BB gun, with a micrometer adjustable rear peep sight, a sling, and a precision smoothbore barrel. It is to be used with Daisy's precision-ground steel BBs that are made for the 499. The 499 is unusual in that it is a single-shot, muzzleloading spring airgun. The 499 is most commonly used in 5-meter (16 ft) BB gun competitions by youth groups such as 4H and Boy Scouts.

During the Vietnam War Daisy BB guns were used in Quick Kill training for soldiers in basic training.

=== Winchester licensed products ===
Daisy also sells a line of spring-air rifles marketed under the Winchester brand name. These are moderately priced break-barrel and semi-automatic CO_{2}-based designs with wood or composite stocks, with velocities ranging from 500 ft/s (150 m/s) to 1,000 ft/s (300 m/s). For a time, Daisy also imported and marketed an Umarex made, Winchester branded copy of the Winchester 1894 rifle. This is a multi-shot CO_{2} pellet rifle using the standard Umarex revolver action. This model is now marketed under the Walther name.

=== Red Ryder BB Gun ===
Red Ryder BB Gun
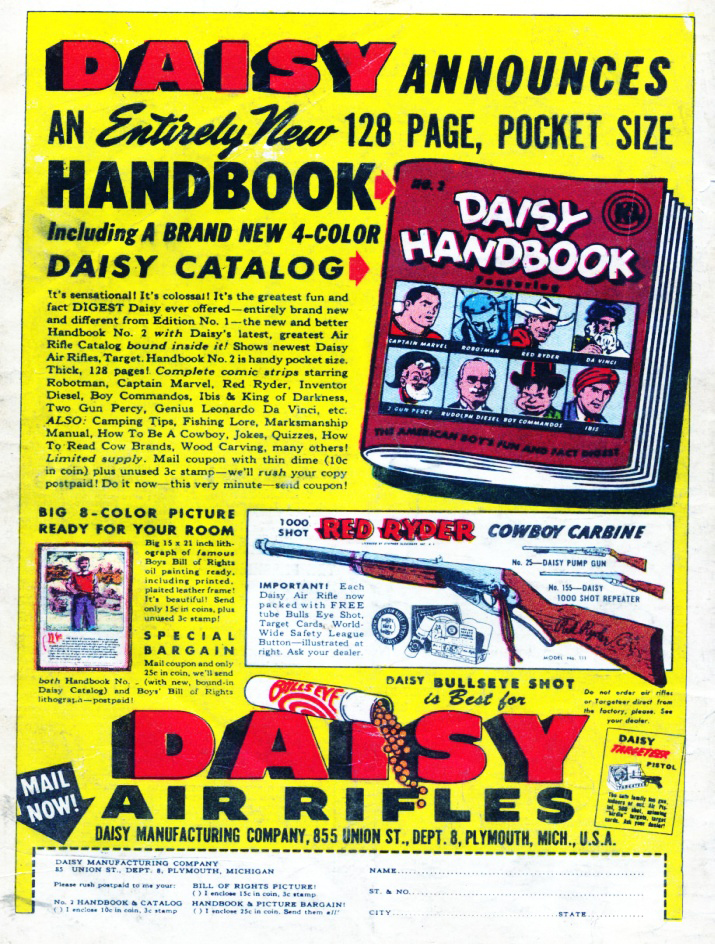
- Daisy air rifle ad in a 1940s comic book
- Type: Air rifle
- Place of origin: United States

Production history
- Manufacturer: Daisy Outdoor Products
- Unit cost: $39.99
- Produced: 1940–

Specifications
- Mass: 2.2 lb (1.00 kg)
- Length: 35.4 in (90 cm)
- Cartridge: .177 BB
- Caliber: .177
- Barrels: Smooth bore
- Action: Lever-action spring-piston
- Rate of fire: 5-30 RPM
- Muzzle velocity: 350 feet per second (110 m/s)
- Maximum firing range: 195 yards (178 m)
- Feed system: Gravity-fed tubular magazine
- Sights: Rear notch, fixed front blade

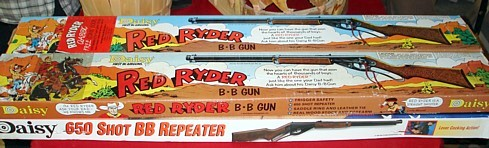
Two Red Ryder BB Guns in box. These are a relatively recent reissue. In continuous production since 1940, these newer boxes promote the gun as being "just like the one your Dad had!"

The Red Ryder BB Gun is a BB gun made by Daisy Outdoor Products and introduced in the spring of 1940 that resembles the Winchester rifle of Western movies. Named for the comic strip cowboy character Red Ryder (created in 1938, and who appeared in numerous films between 1940 and 1950, and on television in 1956), the BB gun is still in production, though the comic strip was cancelled in 1963.

==== Design and specifications ====
The Red Ryder BB Gun is a lever-action, spring piston air gun with a steel smooth bore barrel. Current production (ca. 2017) has a rear iron sight adjustable for elevation only and a post front sight. It uses a gravity feed magazine with a 650 BB capacity. It has an engraved wooden stock and a saddle ring with leather thong on the receiver.

A youth model airgun, the Model 1938B Red Ryder produces an actual muzzle velocity of about 270 feet per second (82 m/s), although the specification on the Daisy states the Model 1938B Red Ryder has a "Max. Muzzle Velocity" of 350 feet per second (110 m/s) with a nominal .177 caliber, 5.1 grain steel BB.

The effective range is fairly short, about 10 yards (9 m), after which the low velocity and inaccuracy of the smoothbore barrel makes hitting the target difficult. BB guns are shot competitively at distances of 5 meters (16 ft), but the Red Ryder's open sight, which is also hampered by having no windage adjustment, makes it impractical for competition so it is primarily a plinking airgun.

==== Popular culture ====
- The Red Ryder BB gun was prominently featured in the 1983 film A Christmas Story, in which Ralphie Parker requests one for Christmas, but is repeatedly rebuffed with the warning "You'll shoot your eye out." The movie's fictional BB gun, described as the "Red Ryder carbine-action, two hundred shot Range Model air rifle with a compass in the stock and this thing which tells time," does not correspond to any model in existence nor even a prototype; the Red Ryder featured in the movie was specially made to match author Jean Shepherd's story (which may be artistic license, but was the configuration Shepherd claimed to remember). However, the "Buck Jones" Daisy air rifle, immediately above the Red Ryder in the Daisy line, did have a compass and sundial in the stock, but no other features of the "Red Ryder" model. In 2020, Daisy released a limited-edition model of the Red Ryder titled, "A Christmas Wish," featuring the compass and sundial in the stock.
- Crazy Earl, a character in the 1979 book The Short-Timers and the 1987 film, Full Metal Jacket, based on the book, carries a Daisy Red Ryder BB gun in addition to his M16 rifle.
- Hogarth Hughes owns and uses a Red Ryder BB Gun in Brad Bird's 1999 film The Iron Giant.
- In the 2011 movie Tactical Force about a SWAT team using non conventional methods, SWAT Sgt. Hunt (played by the actor Michael Jai White) uses a Red Ryder BB gun which he named 'Daisy' to shoot a kidnapper/robber in the forehead.
- In a post game interview in a Week 10 game against the Cincinnati Bengals in the 2015 season, J. J. Watt in a quote referring to quarterback Andy Dalton: "Our goal was to come out here and make the Red Rifle look like a Red Ryder BB Gun, and I think we did that." The reference was used as a play on Dalton's "Red Rifle" nickname. Dalton's response made the quote go viral.

=== V/L caseless rifles ===
Daisy was the first company to introduce a production caseless ammunition and rifle, the V/L Rifle, in 1968. The V/L ammunition consisted of a .22 caliber bullet with a small disk of propellant on the back, and no primer. The rifle resembled a typical spring-air rifle, but the hot, high pressure air served not only as a power source but also to ignite the propellant on the back of the V/L cartridge. The V/L guns and ammunition were discontinued in 1969 after the BATFE ruled that they constituted a firearm, and Daisy, which was not licensed to manufacture firearms at that time, decided to discontinue manufacture rather than become a firearms manufacturer. About 23,000 of the rifles were made before production ceased.

=== Rimfire rifles ===
In 1988 Daisy briefly made a line of rimfire rifles, the Legacy rifle. These were bolt action or semi-automatic rifles chambered in .22 Long Rifle, and were available in a number of different models. Options were wooden stock or plastic stock with adjustable buttplate, and single-shot, 7-shot box magazine (for semi-automatic models only), or 10-shot rotary-feed (the magazine was similar to, but not interchangeable with, the Ruger 10/22). While these are very rare, the inexpensive construction and the fact that they are firearms, not airguns, has led to little collectors' interest.

== Lawsuit ==
Daisy was the defendant in a lawsuit after a Pennsylvania teenager, John Tucker Mahoney, was accidentally shot in the head in May 1999 when a friend fired one of their BB guns at him, believing it to be empty. This left him severely brain damaged, and in a near vegetative state later on. The lawsuit alleged that the company hid manufacturing defects, specifically the BB guns jamming, and demanded that the gun in question be recalled. The company settled the lawsuit with Mahoney's family for $18 million in a case that received worldwide publicity. Mahoney died of his injuries in October 2003.
