= Electronic firing =

Type of firearm action

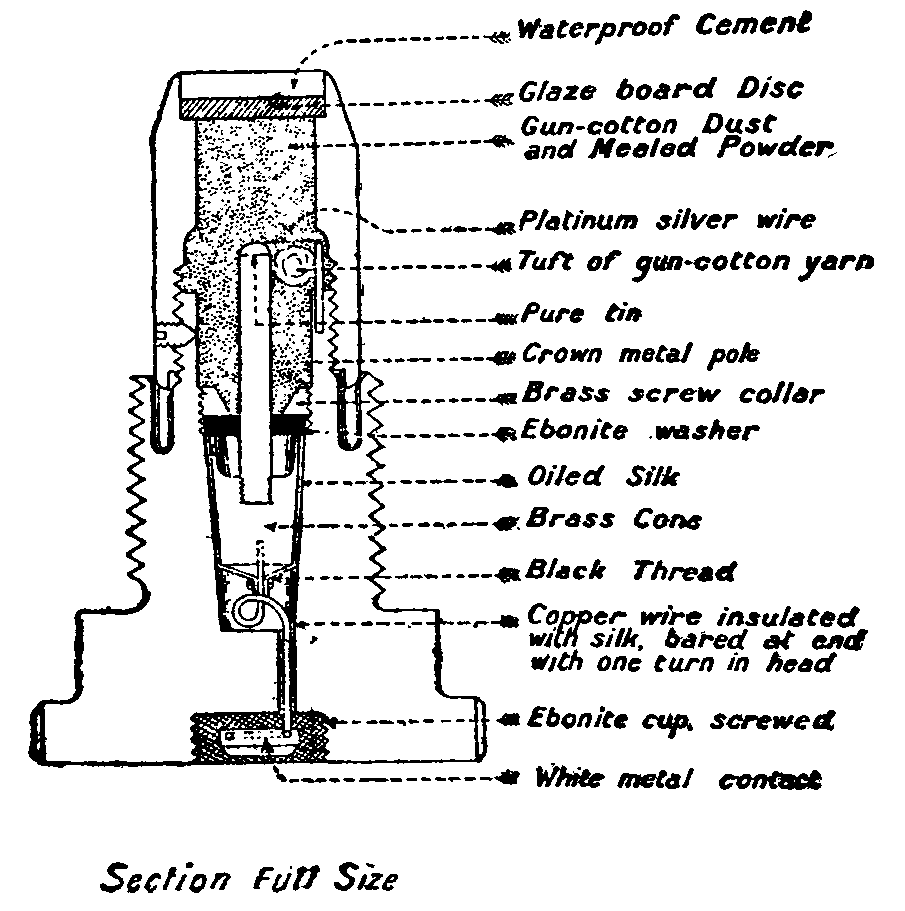

Electronic firing refers to the use of an electric current to fire a cartridge instead of a centerfire primer or rimfire primer.

In modern firearm designs, a firing pin and primer are used to ignite the propellant in the cartridge which propels the bullet forward. The firing pin must travel a short distance, creating a short delay between the user pulling the trigger and the weapon firing, which generally decreases accuracy.

However, in an electronic-firearm, an electric current instead of conventional mechanical action is used to ignite the propellant which fires the projectile.

There are two approaches to electrically firing the cartridge. One method retains the primer, which functions analogously as a conventional primer. However, rather than being struck by a firing pin or by equivalent mechanical means, an electric current serves to detonate the primer, after which the provided action delivers the thermal impulse necessary to ignite the propellant, which then deflagrates, producing pressure. The second approach, electrothermal-chemical, utilizes a plasma cartridge. In this mechanism, an electric current is used to generate plasma that ignites the propellant in a controlled manner.

Electronic firing is also used in aircraft autocannons and ammunition as they are more resistant to jamming in environments with high G-forces.

== Examples ==
- MG 131 machine gun
- Heckler & Koch P11
- EIW97
- Remington Model 700 EtronX
- M61 Vulcan
- L118 light gun
- FD Munitions L5
- Rikhter R-23
- Marble gun
- Voere VEC-91
- Metal Storm Limited

== See also ==
- Solenoid (engineering)
- Laser ignition
- Electrothermal-chemical technology
- Remote controlled weapon station
