= Daisy Model 25 =

Model 25
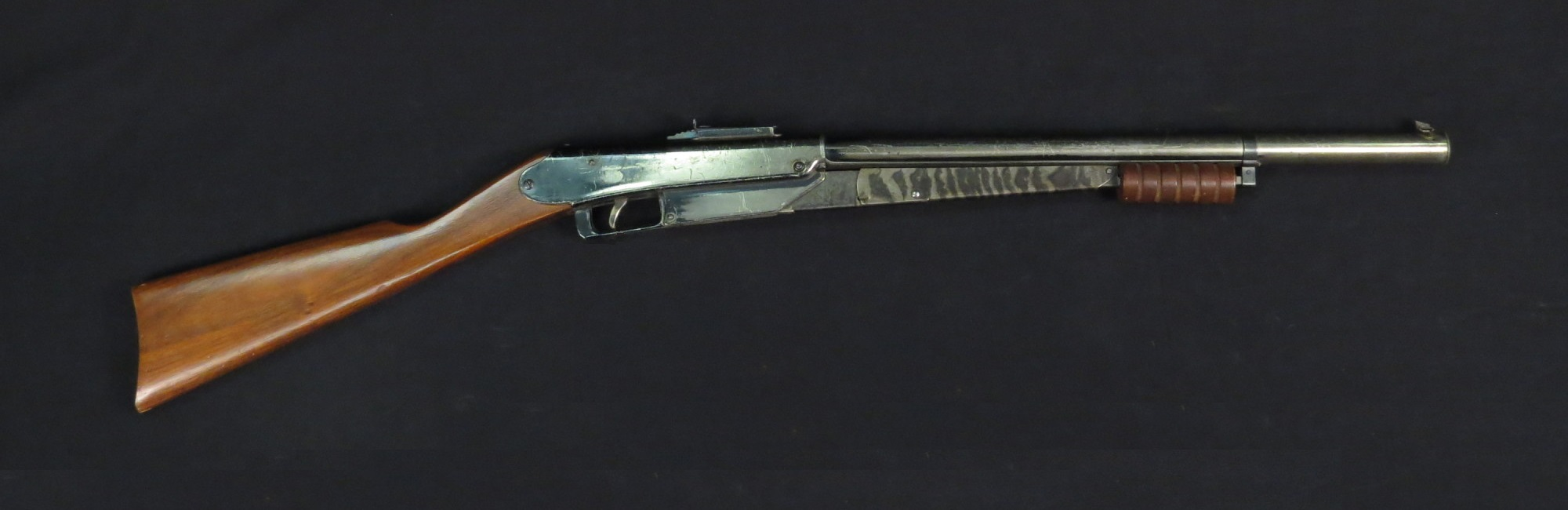
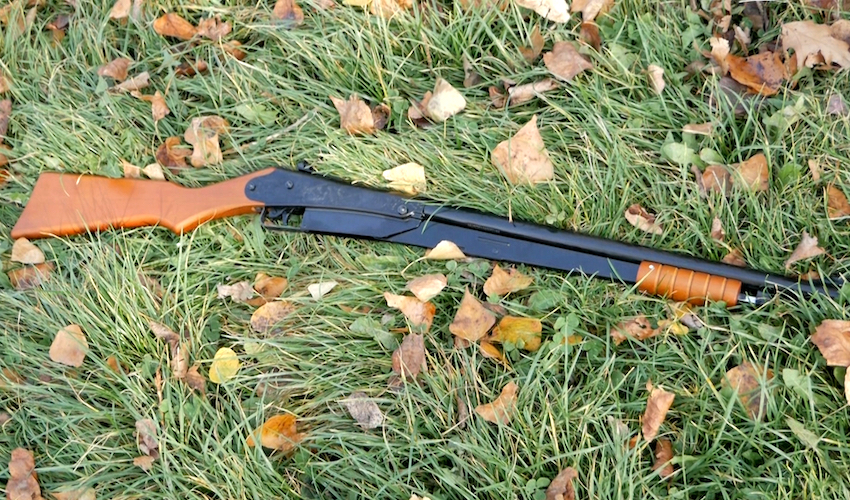
- The Model 25
- Place of origin: United States

Production history
- Designer: Charles F. Lefever
- Manufacturer: Daisy
- Unit cost: $49.99 (MSRP)
- Produced: 1917–1978, 2007-present
- No. built: 8 million

Specifications
- Mass: 3 lb (1.4 kg)
- Length: 37 in (94 cm)
- Caliber: .177 cal. (4.5 mm) BB
- Action: Pump action
- Muzzle velocity: 350 ft/s (110 m/s)
- Effective firing range: 195 yd (178 m)
- Feed system: spring-loaded 50 BB magazine
- Sights: Iron sights

The Daisy Model 25 is a BB gun, modeled after a pump action shotgun with a trombone pump action mechanism. The Model 25 dominated the low price, higher performance airgun market for over 50 years (1914–1978) before discontinuation. They re-entered production in 2009.

The Model 25 was designed by Charles F. Lefever. By some accounts, 15 million pieces were sold by 1957 and 20 million by 1980. Other estimates are "over 8 million".

Lever action models generally have very low velocities, around 275 ft/s (84 m/s), a result of the weak springs used to keep cocking efforts low for use by youths. The Daisy Model 25 pump-action BB gun typically achieved 350 ft/s (110 m/s). However, the 25's capacity was only 50 BBs, in comparison to the 1000 BB capacity of some leverguns. The 25 does have an advantage in ammunition feeding, however, in that its feeding is spring-loaded, as opposed to many gravity-fed guns which require a shift in gun angle to reload a BB.

The re-issued version is made in China and has a muzzle velocity of approx 350 ft/s (110 m/s).
