= Scabbard =

Sheath for the blade of a sword or dagger

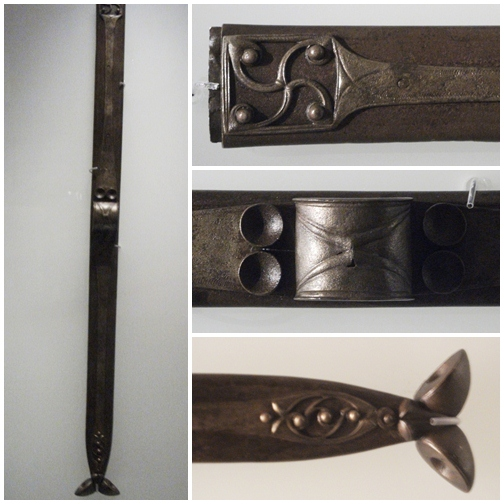
An elaborate Celtic scabbard in two colours of bronze, c. 1 to 200 AD

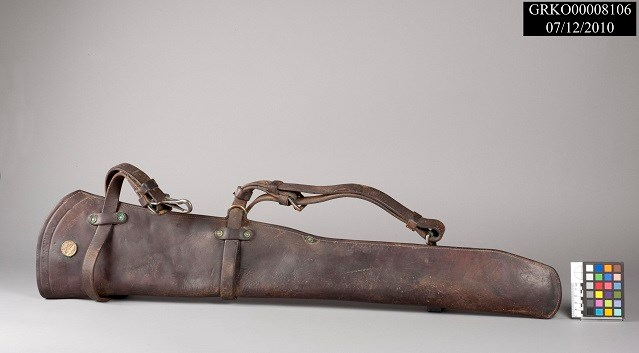
A 1916 leather scabbard for a saddle lever-action rifle of Jack Peters, a ranch hand who worked on the Grant-Kohrs Ranch in Powell County, Montana

A scabbard is a sheath for holding a sword, dagger, knife, or similar edged weapons. Rifles and other long guns may also be stored in scabbards by horse riders for transportation. Military cavalry and cowboys had scabbards for their saddle ring carbines and rifles for transportation and protection. Scabbards have been made of many materials over the millennia, including leather, wood, and metal such as brass or steel.

Most commonly, sword scabbards were worn suspended from a sword belt or shoulder belt called a baldric.

== Antiquity ==
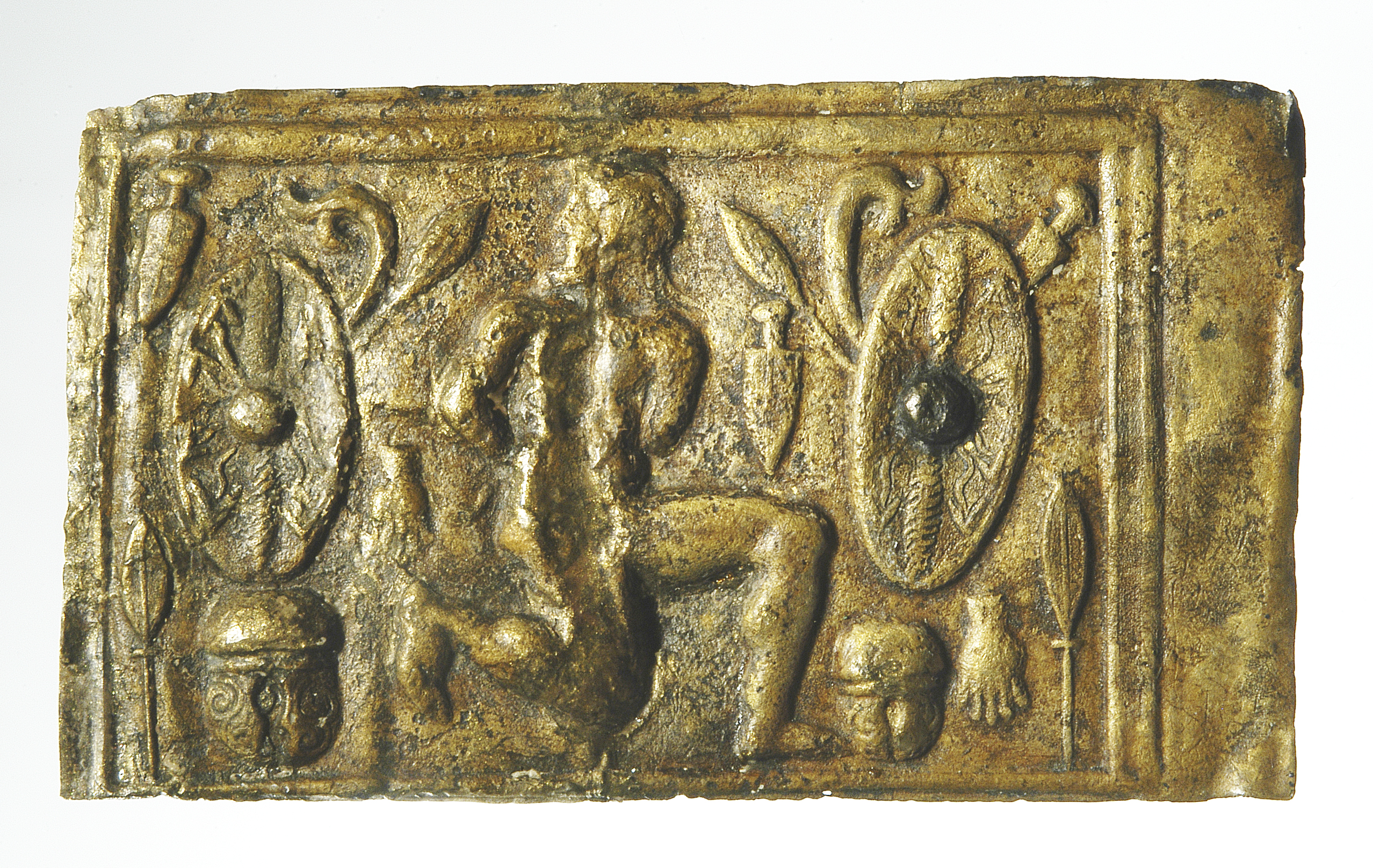
Bronze scabbard fitting from a Roman gladius, c. 40-250 AD

Scabbards have at least been around since the Bronze Age, and are thought to have existed as long as the blade has. Wooden scabbards were typically covered in fabric or leather; the leather versions also usually bore metal or leather fittings for added protection and carrying ease. All-metal scabbards were popular items for a display of wealth among elites in the European Iron Age, and often intricately decorated. Little is known about the scabbards of the early Iron Age, due to their wooden construction. However, during the Middle and late Iron Ages, the scabbard became important especially as a vehicle for decorative elaboration and social status. After 200 BC fully decorated scabbards became rare, but in their lesser extent existed well into the Medieval period.

A number of ancient scabbards have been recovered from weapons sacrifices, a few of which had a lining of fur on the inside. The fur was probably kept oily, keeping the blade free from rust. The fur would also allow a smoother, quicker draw, and protect the blade. In Britain, wool sometimes lined the scabbard, the lanolin on it working to protect against rust. In classical antiquity, Greek scabbards often had ornamental metal fittings, characteristic of the Iron Age. The Roman army used scabbards to a great extent with short baldrics, carrying their swords quite high up.

Japanese blades typically have their sharp cutting edge protected by a wooden scabbard called a saya. Many Japanese blades such as the Wakizashi or the Katana feature notably curved blades and so the saya was also curved to better fit them. A saya consists of several key parts: the wooden scabbard body or koiguchi, the kurikata (horn for sageo cord), the sageo cord, the kojiri, and an option ornamental shitodome for the kurikata. The saya is typically made of lightweight wood, such as magnolia, and covered with lacquer to protect the blade and prevent scratches.

== Modern era ==
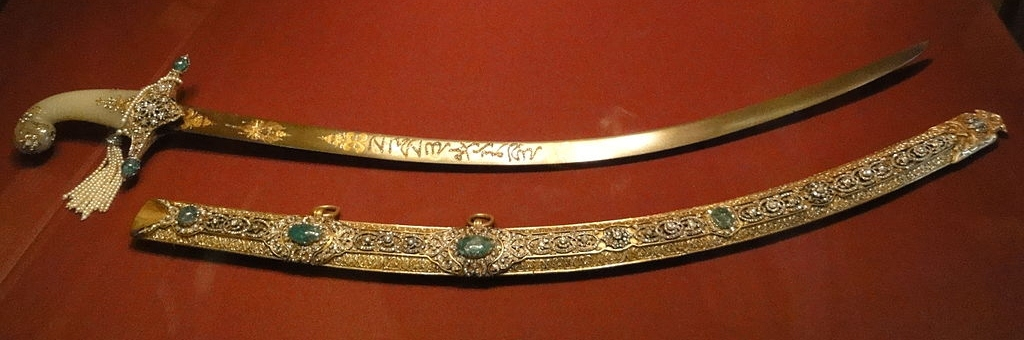
Princely Mughal sabre with jewelled scabbard

Entirely metal scabbards became popular in Europe early in the 19th century and eventually superseded most other types. Metal was more durable than leather and could better withstand the rigors of field use, particularly among troops mounted on horseback. In addition, metal offered the ability to present a more military appearance, as well as the opportunity to display increased ornamentation. Nevertheless, leather scabbards never entirely lost favor among military users and were widely used as late as the American Civil War (1861–1865). As late as the outbreak of World War I in August 1914, swords and leather scabbards were still being carried on active service by the military officers of participating nations. Metal scabbards had however been withdrawn as noisy, heavy and likely to blunt the blades of newly sharpened swords. In the event swords and scabbards were quickly discarded except for use by mounted cavalry.

Some military police forces, naval shore patrols, law enforcement and other groups used leather scabbards as a kind of truncheon.

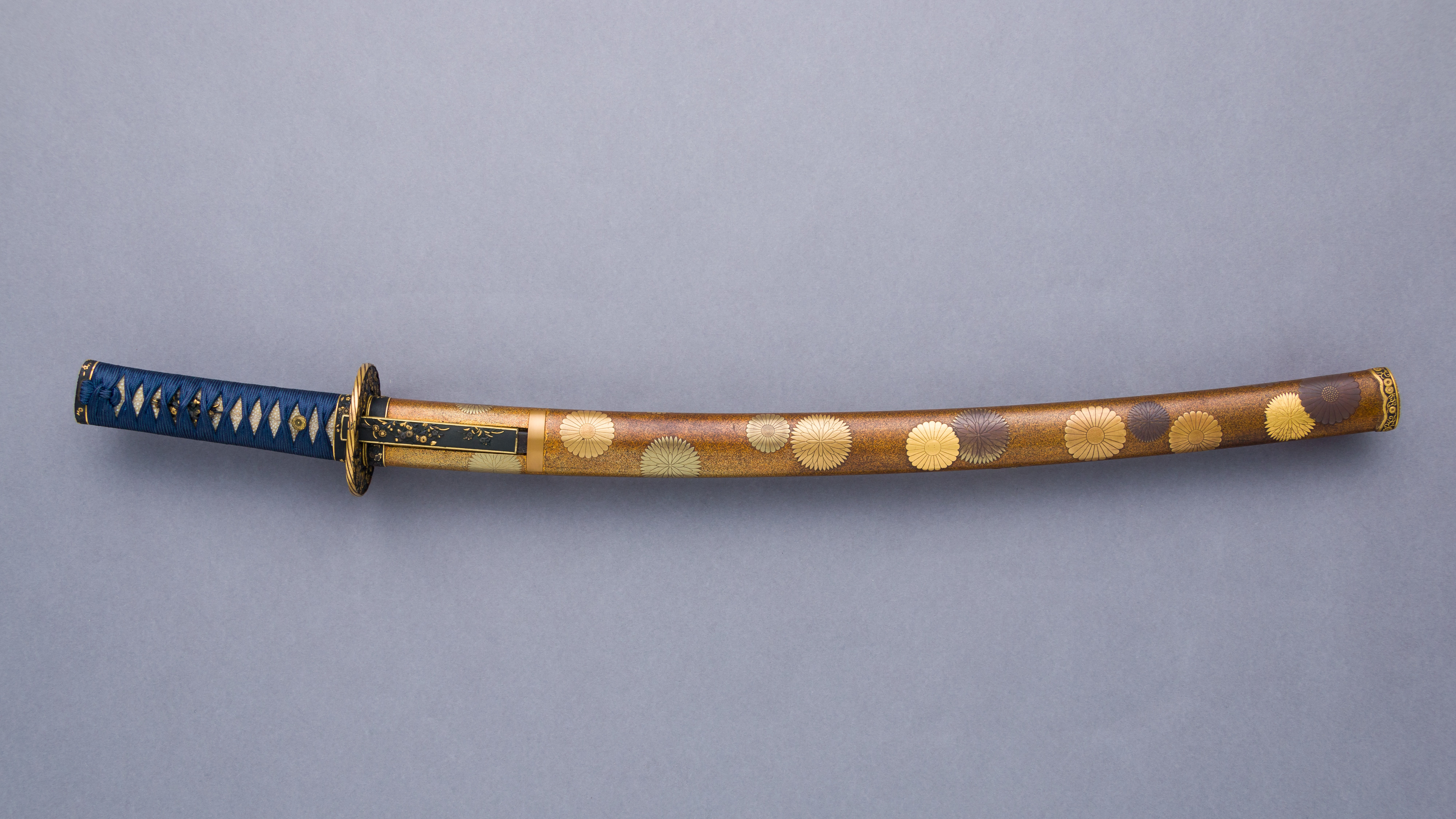
Mounting for a Japanese short sword (wakizashi) 18th century. Metropolitan Museum of Art

On the other hand, in Japan, except for some cases of the Imperial Japanese Army and Navy, water-resistant lacquered wooden scabbards have been used throughout history.

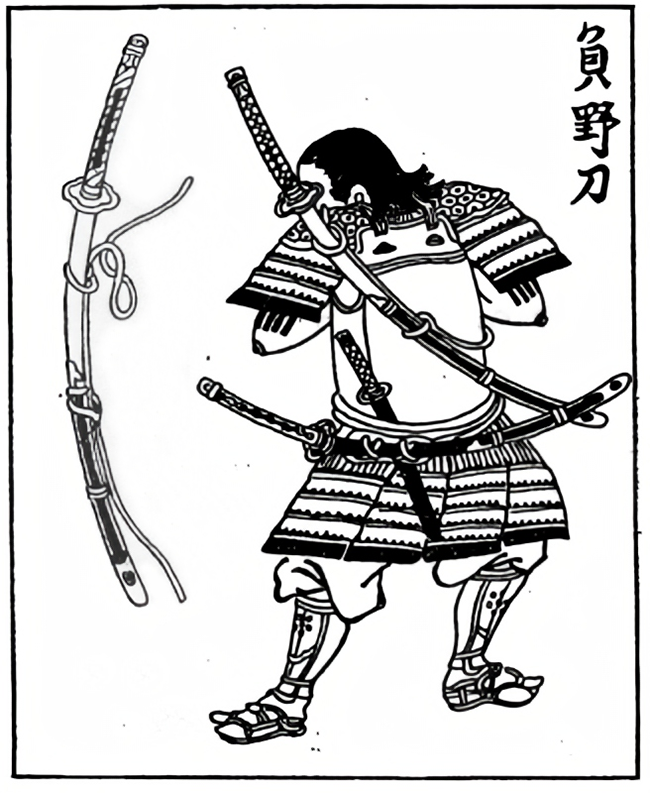
A Japanese Edo period wood block print of a samurai carrying a nodachi/ōdachi on his back

Scabbards were historically, albeit rarely, worn across the back, but only by a handful of Celtic tribes, and only with very short lengths of sword. This is because drawing a long, sharp blade over one's shoulder and past one's head from a scabbard on the back is relatively awkward, especially in a hurry, and the length of the arm sets a hard upper limit on how long a blade can be drawn at all in this way. Sheathing the sword again is even harder since it has to be done effectively blind unless the scabbard is taken off first. Common depictions of long swords being drawn from the back are a modern invention, born from safety and convenience considerations on a film set and typically enabled by creative editing, and have enjoyed such great popularity in fiction and fantasy that they are widely and incorrectly believed to have been common in Medieval times. Some more well-known examples of this include the back scabbard depicted in the film Braveheart and the back scabbard seen in the video game series The Legend of Zelda. This has facilitated the modern anachronism colloquially known as a shabbard, developed by YouTuber and novel writer Shad Brooks. It uses a flat plate attached to the sheath which more easily guides even large swords into the scabbard. There is some limited data from woodcuts and textual fragments that Mongol light horse archers, Chinese soldiers, Japanese samurai and European knights wore a slung baldric over the shoulder, allowing longer blades such as greatswords/zweihanders and nodachi/ōdachi to be strapped across the back, though these would have to be removed from the back before the sword could be unsheathed.

In The Ancient Celts by Barry Cunliffe, Cunliffe writes, "All these pieces of equipment [shields, spears, swords, mail] mentioned in the texts, are reflected in the archaeological record and in the surviving iconography, though it is sometimes possible to detect regional variations" (page 94). Among the Parisii of Yorkshire, for example, the "...sword was sometimes worn across the back and therefore had to be drawn over the shoulder from behind the head."

Modern knife sheaths are frequently made of polymer materials such as Kydex.

== Common terms ==
The metal fitting where the blade enters the leather or metal scabbard is called the throat, which is often part of a larger scabbard mount, or locket, that bears a carrying ring or stud to facilitate wearing the sword. The blade's point in leather scabbards is usually protected by a metal tip, or chape, which, on both leather and metal scabbards, is often given further protection from wear by an extension called a drag, or shoe.

== See also ==
- Holster
