= Caseless ammunition =

Type of weapon-cartridge

Caseless ammunition

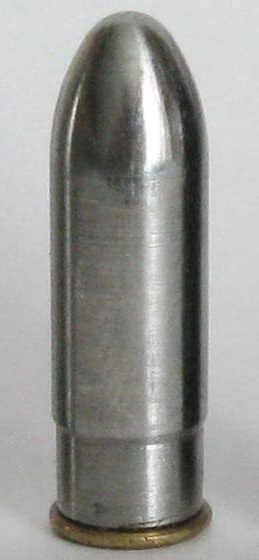
Internal propellant
Caseless 7.62 mm Gerasimenko projectile with internal propellant. Used in the VAG-73 machine pistol.

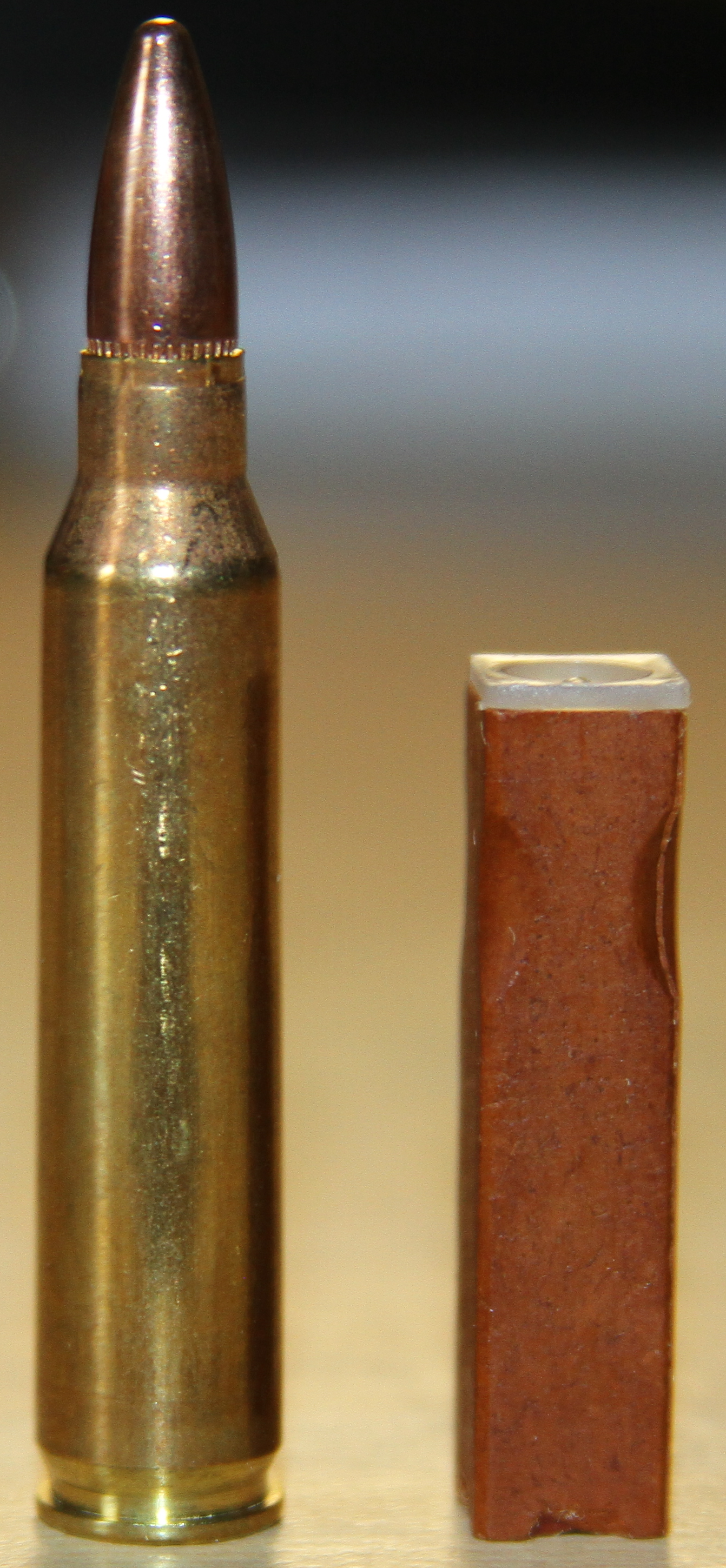
External propellant
Comparison of .223 Remington (left) and external propellant caseless 4.73×33mm Heckler & Koch G11 ammunition (right).

Caseless ammunition (CL), or caseless cartridge, is a configuration of weapon-cartridge that eliminates the cartridge case that typically holds the primer, propellant and projectile together as a unit. Instead, the propellant and primer are fitted to the projectile in another way so that a cartridge case is not needed, for example inside or outside the projectile depending on configuration.

Caseless ammunition is an attempt to reduce the weight and cost of ammunition by dispensing with the case, which is typically precision made of brass or steel, as well as to simplify the operation of repeating guns by eliminating the need to extract and eject the empty case after firing. Its acceptance has been hampered by problems with production expenses, heat sensitivity, sealing, and fragility. Its use to date has been mainly limited to prototypes and low-powered guns, with some exceptions.

== Internal-propellant caseless ammunition ==
=== Description ===
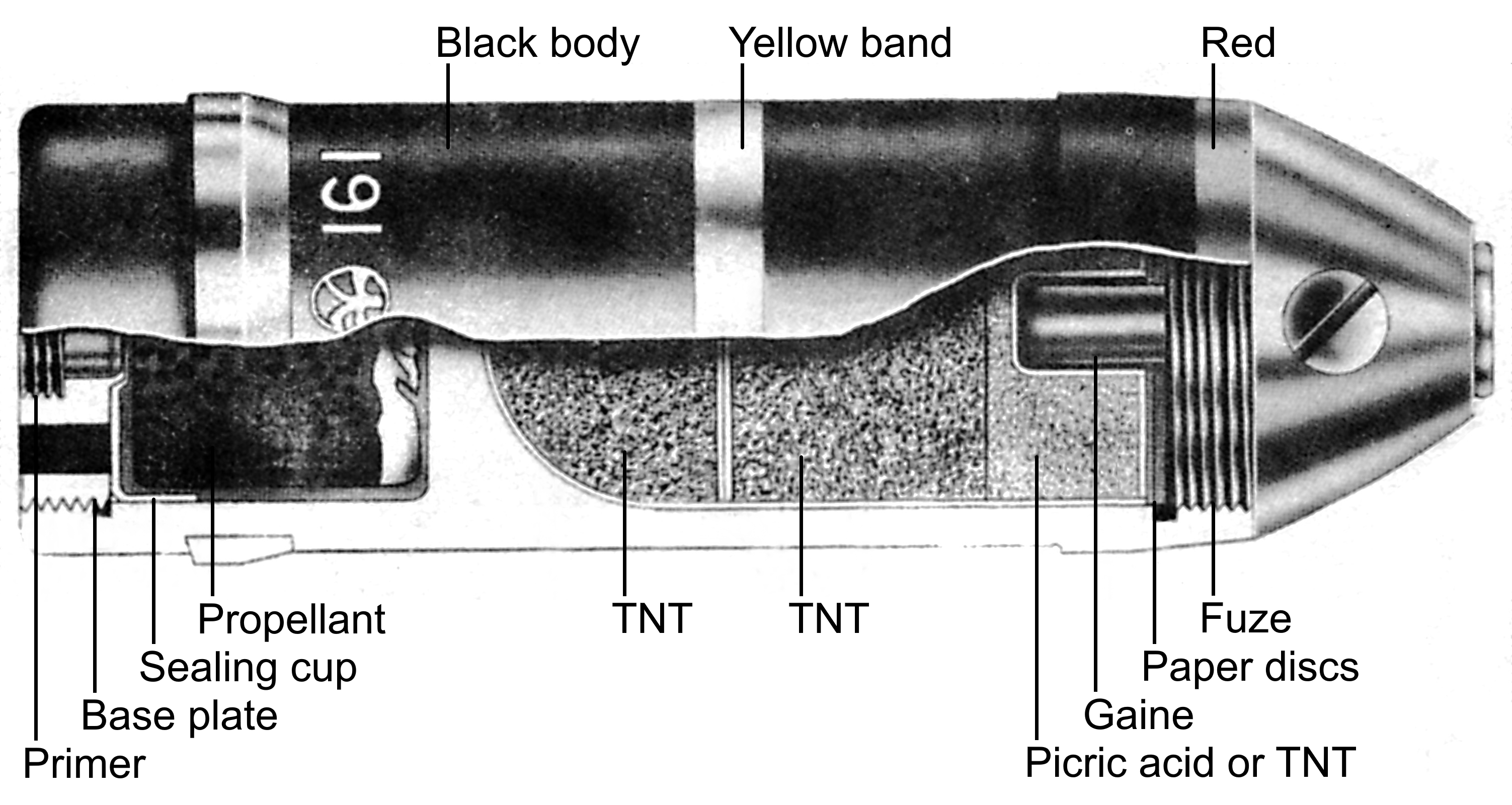
Cross section of internal-propellant caseless ammunition, type 40 mm Ho-301.

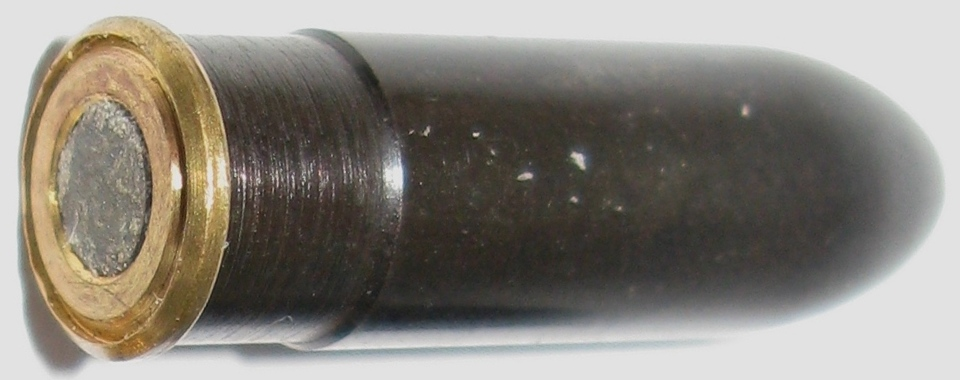
7.62 mm Gerasimenko, internal-propellant caseless ammunition used in the VAG-73 machine pistol

Older caseless ammunition typically uses a rocket-like configuration which integrates the primer and propellant into the bottom of the projectile and accelerates it by venting propellant gas out the back. Unlike rocket projectiles, which have similar configurations, the propellant of "internal-propellant caseless ammunition" has an instant burn time like a traditional cartridge (under 0.2 seconds), meaning the propellant burns up before the projectile leaves the barrel, preferably inside the chamber. Rocket projectiles, in comparison, have propellant burn times of over 0.2 seconds, usually several seconds, meaning rocket propellant traditionally propels the rocket for a certain distance from the launcher.

Another difference is means of fire and stabilization. As a cartridge, internal-propellant caseless ammunition is only fired from gun barrels, either closed or recoilless, and achieves ballistic stabilization through longitudinal spinning (conservation of angular momentum), either by the use of driving bands and rifling or oblique nozzles for the propellant gas. Rockets, in contrast, can be fired from more platforms than gun barrels, for example, rails, and traditionally use fins for stabilization, either fixed or foldable.

=== History ===
An early type of internal-propellant caseless ammunition was Walter Hunt's Rocket Ball cartridge. It was developed in the 1850s and the guns using it were sold primarily by Volcanic Repeating Arms. Hunt's Rocket Ball cartridges were severely under-powered and never saw wide acceptance for self-protection, hunting, or military use.

During World War II, Germany began an intensive program to research and develop a practical internal-propellant caseless ammunition cartridge for military use, which was driven by the rising scarcity of metals, especially copper used to make cartridge cases. The Germans had some success, but not sufficient to produce a caseless cartridge system during the war. One quasi-example which almost entered production was the 55 mm Maschinenkanone MK 155, which used partially combustible cartridges, similar to the ones used in the popular Rheinmetall Rh-120 tank gun today. Japan, however, successfully developed an aircraft mounted autocannon using internal-propellant caseless ammunition during the war. Named Ho-301, it was a 40 mm autocannon and saw limited action in the defense of the Japanese home islands during the waning months of the war.

After WWII the use of internal-propellant caseless ammunition largely disappeared from mainstream weapons development; however, the type saw a small resurgence when the Soviet Union introduced their GP-25 40 mm internal-propellant caseless under-barrel grenade launcher in 1978. This was followed by the Russian-developed AGS‑40 Balkan 40 mm internal-propellant caseless automatic grenade launcher in 2017.

=== Issues ===
Since propellant is blasted out the back of the projectile during fire, many historical guns using internal-propellant caseless ammunition have had problems with residue buildup from the propellant, leading to malfunctions. To decrease residue buildup, historical systems have often been forced to use lower amounts of propellant in the ammunition or adopting a recoilless solution for the gun where some of the burning propellant is vented out the back of the gun when firing. This, however, causes problems on its own as less propellant is being used to propel the ammunition, leading to less potent muzzle velocities, often under the speed of sound (~250–350 m/s (820–1,150 ft/s)). This is equal to the muzzle-velocities of many mortar-weapons which are meant to be fired at high angles of elevation with heavy projectile arcs. Caseless ammunition weapons are often meant for horizontal fire, meaning that highly sub-sonic ammunition leads to very limited range and poor accuracy due to the rapid loss of projectile velocity.

=== Gallery ===
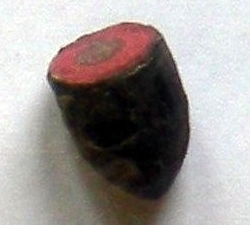
Volcanic .41 Rocket Ball internal-propellant caseless ammunition cartridge

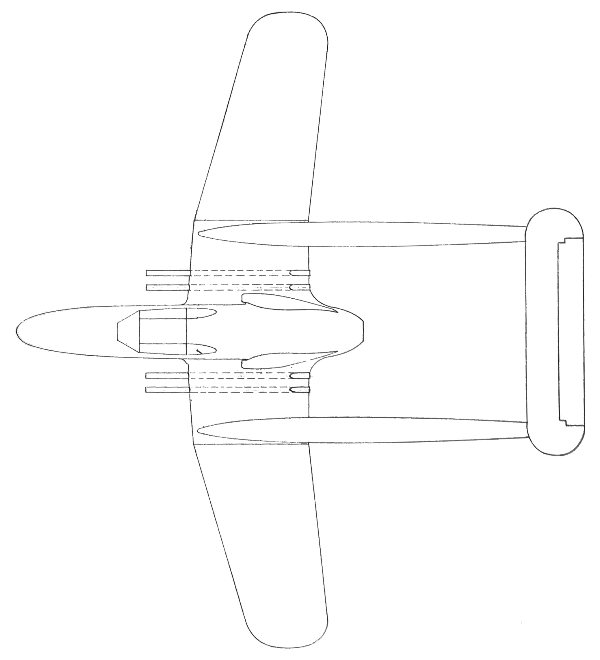
Proposed CL-armament for the Saab 21R, consisting of four 95 mm internal-propellant caseless cannons mounted in the wings

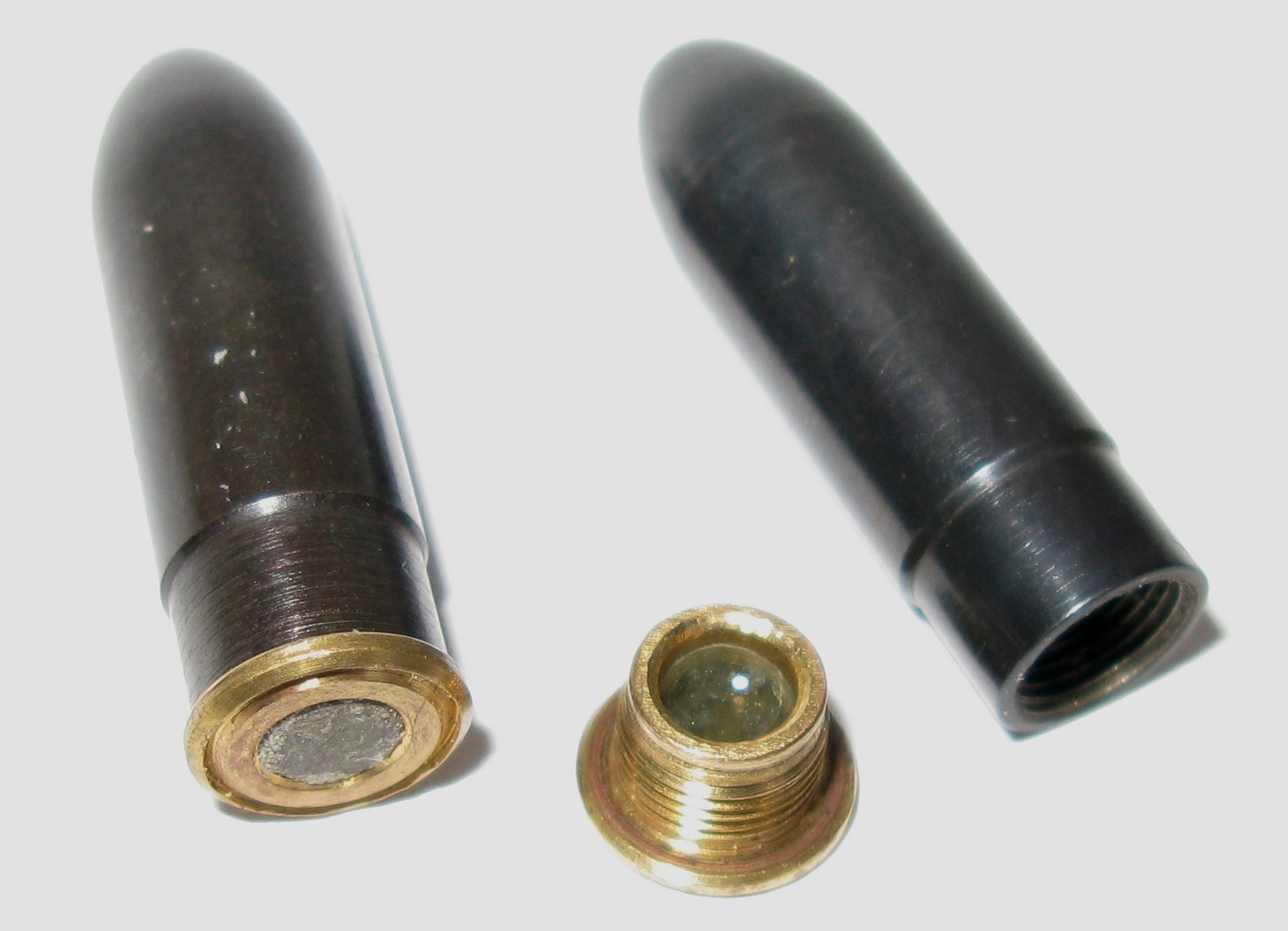
7.62 mm Gerasimenko internal-propellant caseless ammunition for the VAG-73 machine pistol

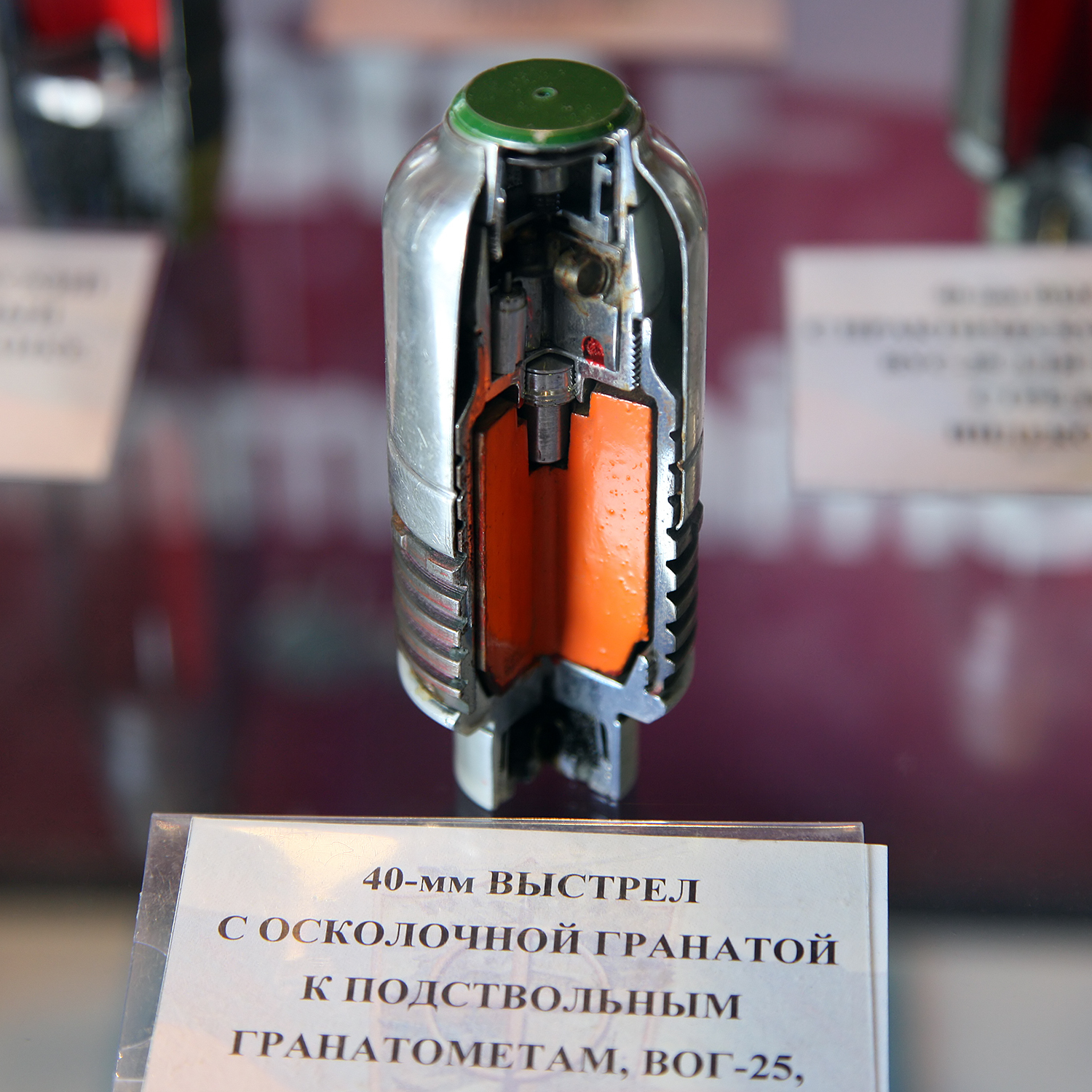
VOG-25 7P17 internal-propellant caseless ammunition for the 40 mm GP-25 under-barrel grenade launcher

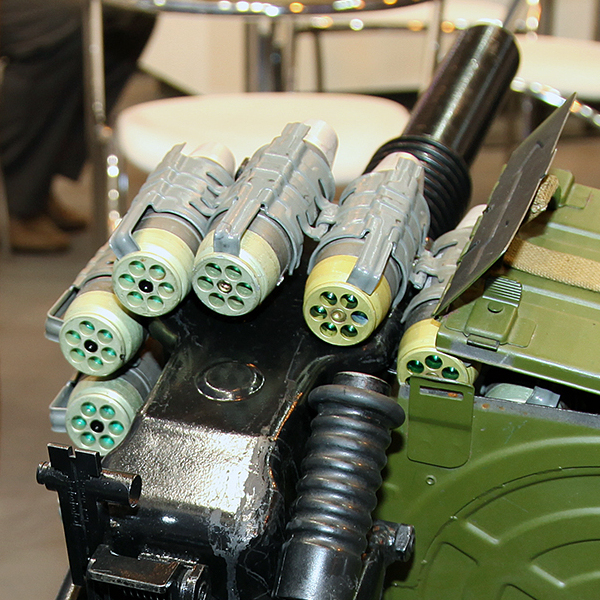
7P39 internal-propellant caseless ammunition for the 40 mm AGS‑40 Balkan automatic grenade launcher

== External-propellant caseless ammunition ==
=== Description ===
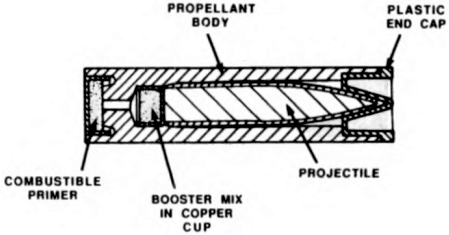
Cross section of external-propellant caseless ammunition, type 4.92 × 34 mm Heckler & Koch

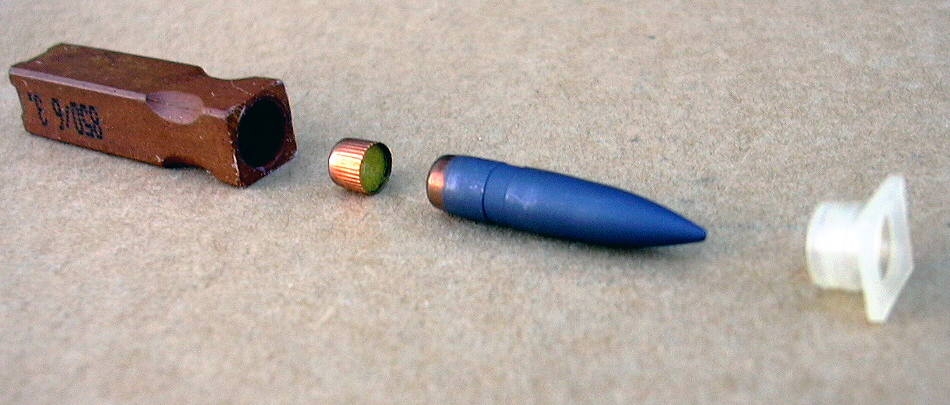
4.73 × 33 mm Heckler & Koch, external-propellant caseless ammunition disassembled. The components are, from left to right: the solid propellant, the primer, the bullet, and a plastic cap that serves to keep the bullet centered in the propellant block.

Modern caseless ammunition typically uses a configuration in which the primer and projectile gets integrated into a solid mass of external propellant (originally nitrocellulose), cast to form the body of the cartridge. Cavities exist in the body to accept the bullet and a primer (both of which are glued into place). The completed cartridge might also contain a booster charge of powdered propellant to help ignite the body and provide initial thrust to the bullet. Many of these external-propellant caseless cartridges are also telescoped, with the bulk of the bullet held within the body of the cartridge, to cut down on cartridge length. A shorter cartridge cuts down on the distance the firearm's action must reciprocate to load a new round, which allows for higher cyclic rates and greater probability of multiple hits on a target at long range. Lack of a case also reduces the weight of the cartridge substantially, especially in small bore rifles. For example, the external-propellant caseless ammunition designed by Austrian inventor Hubert Usel (1926–2010) for the Voere VEC-91 weighs about one third as much as regular ammunition for the same caliber.

=== Issues ===
While it seems a simple operation to replace the case with a piece of solid propellant, the cartridge case provides more than just a way to keep the cartridge components together, and these other functions must be replaced if the case is to be replaced. External-propellant caseless ammunition is not without its drawbacks, and it is these drawbacks that have kept modern external-propellant caseless ammunition from achieving wider success.

==== Heat sensitivity ====
The first major problem, of special concern in military applications, which often involve sustained firing, is the heat sensitivity of the ammunition. Nitrocellulose, the primary component of modern firearm propellant, ignites at a relatively low temperature of around 170 °C (338 °F). One of the functions of the metallic cartridge case is as a heat sink; when extracted after firing, every metallic case carries away a significant amount of the heat from the combustion of the propellant, slowing the rate at which heat builds up in the chamber. The thermal insulation provided by the case also works the other way around, shielding the propellant from built-up heat in the chamber walls.

Without a case to provide these functions, external-propellant caseless rounds using nitrocellulose will begin to cook off, firing from the residual chamber heat, much sooner than cased cartridges do. Cooking off can be avoided by designing the weapon to fire from an open bolt, but this introduces other problems, and thus is only suitable for smaller-calibre machine guns and submachine guns.

The normal solution to the problem of heat is to increase the heat resistance by switching to a propellant with a higher ignition temperature, typically a non-crystalline explosive carefully formulated to provide an appropriate rate of combustion. Heckler & Koch, in concert with Dynamit Nobel, managed such a task by producing relatively heat-resistant external-propellant caseless ammunition.

==== Sealing ====
Another important function provided by the cartridge is to seal the rear of the chamber. During firing of a cased cartridge, the pressure in the chamber expands the metallic case, which obturates to the chamber. This prevents gas exiting from the rear of the chamber, and it has also been experimentally shown to provide a significant amount of support to the bolt. Without the case to provide this seal, the firearm design must account for this and provide a means of sealing the rear of the chamber. This problem was also encountered with the Dreyse needle gun; the French Chassepot solved the leaking-breech problem with the addition of a rubber seal to the bolt.

Telescoped external-propellant caseless rounds must also deal with the issue of blocking the bore, as the bullet is surrounded by propellant. The booster charge is used to address this issue, providing an initial burst of pressure to force the bullet out of the cartridge body and into the barrel before the body combusts.

==== Fragility ====
External-propellant caseless rounds are limited by the fact that the cartridge body is primarily a propellant, and structural properties are secondary to the combustion properties. The primary issue is one of extraction. While caseless ammunition eliminates the need to extract a fired case, unfired caseless rounds must be extractable to unload the firearm or to clear a misfire. With metallic cases, this ability is provided by a rim or extractor groove machined into the rear of the case. Even in completely plastic-bodied cartridges, such as the Activ brand shotgun shells, a thin metal ring is molded into the rim to provide support for the extractor. A secondary issue is that ammunition in use can be exposed to air, water, lubricants, and solvents. Primer and propellant in external-propellant caseless rounds is unprotected, while cartridge cases provide a high degree of protection.

=== External-propellant caseless guns ===
One of the first caseless firearm and ammunition systems produced was made by Daisy, the airgun maker, in 1968. The Daisy V/L rifle uses a .22 caliber (5.5 mm) low-powered external-propellant caseless round with no primer. The rifle was basically a spring-piston air rifle, but when used with the V/L ammunition the energy from the compression of the piston heated the air behind the caseless cartridge enough to ignite the propellant, and this generated the bulk of the energy of firing. The Daisy V/L rifle system was discontinued in 1969 after the ATF ruled that it was not an airgun, but a firearm, which Daisy was not licensed to produce.

Some assault rifles have used external-propellant caseless ammunition. One of the better-known weapons of this type is the G11 made by Heckler & Koch as a potential replacement for the G3 battle rifle. Although the G11 never entered full production, it went through a number of prototype stages as well as field testing, including testing as part of the American Advanced Combat Rifle program. While it was scheduled to be adopted by the West German military with a plan set out to procure 300,000 G11K2 rifles over a period from 1990 to 2002, the expenses created by the reunification of Germany and the impossibility of modifying the G11 to use NATO-standard ammunition led to the cancellation of the G11 project and the adoption of a cheaper, more conventional NATO-standardised assault rifle, the 5.56 mm G36. The G11's caseless ammunition was later used as the basis for the caseless round development in the US Lightweight Small Arms Technologies program.

The first commercial external-propellant caseless rifle featuring electronic firing was the Voere VEC-91.

== See also ==
- Blunderbuss – Type of firearm with a flared muzzle
- Coilgun – Artillery using coils to electromagnetically propel a projectile
- Gyrojet – Firearm firing gyroscopic rockets in the 1960s
- Polymer-cased ammunition – Type of lighter firearm cartridge
- Telescoped ammunition
