= Saddle ring =

A saddle ring is a metal ring attached to the receiver of a carbine, rifle, or shotgun allowing it to be tied to a saddle or used with a specialized sling.

Saddle rings could be attached directly to the firearm, or in some cases to a saddle ring bar, which allowed the saddle ring to slide along the action, such as on the British Enfield P1856, a short cavalry version of the Pattern 1853 Enfield used in the American Civil War.

Virtually every carbine-sized weapon used in the Civil War was equipped with a saddle ring and/or saddle ring/bar. Saddle rings are most commonly found on lever-action rifles and other firearms of the late 19th and early 20th centuries that were suitable for use on horseback. The muzzle of the rifle was placed in a (carbine socket or boot) scabbard.

The idea behind using the saddle ring, and its carbine sling, is to allow the mounted soldier to never be separated from his weapon.
