= Glossary of military abbreviations =

List of abbreviations, acronyms and initials related to military subjects such as modern armor, artillery, infantry, and weapons, along with their definitions.

== A ==
- A&TWF – Acquisition and technology work force
- a – Army
- AA – Assembly area
  - AA – Anti-aircraft
  - AA – Aegis ashore
- AAA – Anti-aircraft artillery "Triple A"
- AAAV – Advanced Amphibious Assault Vehicle
- AAC – Army Air Corps
- AAD – Armored amphibious dozer
- AADC – Area air defense commander
- AAE – Army acquisition executive
- AAG – Anti-aircraft gun
- AAK – Appliqué armor kit (US)
- AAL – Additional authorization list
- AAN – Army after next
- AAP – Advance authority to procure
- AAPC – Advanced armoured personnel carrier (Turkiye)
- AARADCOM – Army Armament Research and Development Command
- AAR – After-action review
- AASLT – Air assault
- AAV – Amphibious assault vehicle
- AAV – Assault amphibious vehicle
  - AAW – Anti-aircraft warfare
- AAWC – Anti-aircraft warfare coordinator
- AB – Air burst
- ABC – Atomic, biological, chemical (replaced by chemical, biological, radiological (CBR), and nuclear, biological, chemical (NBC))
  - ABC – Automatic brightness control
- ABCS – Automated battlefield control system
- AB(C) – Aviation battalion (combat)
- ABIT – Advanced built-in test
- ABM – Air-bursting munition
- ABM – Anti-ballistic missile
- ABMD – Aegis ballistic missile defense system
- ABMS – Air-bursting ammunition system
- ABN – Airborne
- ABNSOTD – Airborne and Special Operations Test Directorate
- ABRO – Army Base Repair Organization
- ABS – Aww-busting system
- ABS – Anti-lock braking system
- ABSP – Aegis ballistic missile defense (BMD) signal processor
- ABSV – Armoured battlegroup support vehicle
- ABU — Airman Battle Uniform
- ABV – Assault Breacher Vehicle
- A/C – Aircraft commander
- AC – Alternating current
- ACAwa – ATEC contracting activity
- ACA – Ammunition container assembly
- ACADA – Automatic chemical agent detector and alarm
- ACAVP – Advanced composite armoured vehicle platform (UK)
- ACB – Advanced capability build
- ACB/TI – Advanced capability baseline/technical insertion
- ACC – Army contracting command
  - ACC – Aegis computer center
  - ACC – Air Combat Command
- ACCE – Abrams/Crusader common engine
- ACCV – Armored cavalry cannon vehicle (US)
- ACD – Automated common diagrams
- ACE – Armored Combat Earthmover (US)
- ACEGIO – Advanced Conversion Equipment Group Input Output
- ACF – Acquisition Career Field
- ACF-TE – Acquisition Career Field-Test & Evaluation
- ACH – Advanced Combat Helmet (MICH TC-2000 Combat Helmet)
- ACIE – Army Clothing and Individual Equipment
- ACK – Acknowledge
- ACLOS – Automatic Command to Line of Sight
- ACM – Acoustic countermeasures
- ACOG – Advanced Combat Optical Gunsight
- ACOMMS – Acoustic communications
- ACP – Automatic Colt Pistol
  - ACP – Alignment control panel
- ACPU – Aft central processing unit
- ACR – Advanced Combat Rifle
- ACR – Armored cavalry regiment
- ACRV – Armored command and reconnaissance vehicle
- ACS – Artillery communications system
  - ACS – Aegis combat system
  - ACS – Air control supervisor
  - ACS – Anti-collision system
- ACSC – Aegis combat systems center
- ACTD – Advanced concept technology demonstration
- ACTEDS – Acquisition career training and education development system
- ACTS – Aegis combat training system
- ACU – Army Combat Uniform
  - ACU – Antenna coupler unit
- ACV – Aardvark clearing vehicle
  - ACV – Armored combat vehicle
- ACVT – Armored Combat Vehicle Technology Program (US)
- A/D – Analog to digital
- AD – Air defense
- ADA – Air defense artillery
- ADACS – Automated data collection system
- ADAM – Area denial artillery munition
- ADAMS – Air Defense Advanced Mobile System (US)
- ADAP – Advanced digital antenna production
- ADAP – Army designated acquisition programs
- ADATD – Air Defense Artillery Test Directorate
- ADATS – Air defense anti-tank system
  - ADATS – Army Development and Acquisition of Threat Simulators
- ADC-A – Assistant Division Commander – Fire and Maneuver
- ADC-B – Assistant Division Commander – Combat Support
- ADEA – Army Development and Employment Agency
- ADF – Australian Defense Force
- ADG – Acoustic display generator
- ADI – Australian Defense Industries
- ADM – Advanced development model
  - ADM – Acquisition decision memorandum (US)
- ADMAS – Advanced distributed modular acquisition system
- ADNS – Automated digital network system
- ADP – Automated data processing
- ADPE – Automated data processing equipment
- ADS – Advanced display system
- ADSS – ATEC decision support system
- ADTD – Air Defense Test Directorate
- AE – Action express
- AEC – Army evaluation center
- AECU – Antenna environmental control unit
- AEF – Allied expeditionary force
- AEP – Action entry panel
- AER – Alteration equivalent to repair
- AESA – Active electronically scanned array
- AETC – Air Education and Training Command
- AEW&C – Airborne early warning and control
- AEV – Armored engineer vehicle
- AF – Air Force
  - AF – And following (as "in DDG-113 AF ships will receive the AMDR radar")
- AFB – Air Force Base
- AFA/ARA – Aerial field artillery/aerial rocket artillery (US, Vietnam war era attack helicopter batteries employing 2.75 in. FFAR)
- AFARV – Armored, forward area, re-arm vehicle (US)
- AFAS – Advanced Field Artillery System
- AFATDS – Advanced Field Artillery Tactical Data System
- AFC – Australian Flying Corps
- AFC – Army Futures Command
- AFCS – Automatic Fire-Control Systems
- AFD – Automatic Feeding Device
- AFDL – Advanced Flight Deck Lighting
- AFF – Active Fire-and-Forget
- AFFLQ – Active Fire-and-Forget with Laser Cueing
- AFFF – Aqueous Fire Fighting Foam (smothers fire cutting off oxygen)
- AFOTEC – Air Force Operational Test and Evaluation Center
- AFSC – Air Force Specialty Code
- AFSS – Advanced Fire Support System
- AFSV – Armored Fire Support Vehicle
- AFTADS – Advanced Field Artillery Tactical Data System
- AFV – Armored Family of Vehicles (US)
  - AFV – Armored Fighting Vehicle
- AG – Assistant Gunner
- AGC – Automatic Gain Control
- AGF – Army Ground Forces
- AGL – Above Ground Level
  - AGL – Automatic Grenade Launcher
- AGLS – Automatic Gun Laying System
- AGS – Armored Gun System (US)
  - AGS – Advanced Gun System
- AGV – Assault Gun Vehicle
- AGVT – Advanced Ground Vehicle Technology
- Ah – Ampere hour
- AHA – Ammunition Handling Area
- AHC – Attack Helicopter Company (USA)
- AHE – Aircraft Handling Equipment
- AHS – Ammunition Handling System
- AHU – Air Handling Unit
- AI – Action Item
  - AI – Area of Interest
- AIC – Air Intercept Controller (US Navy)
- AICS – Accuracy International Chassis System
- AICW – Advanced Individual Combat Weapon
- AIF – Australian Imperial Force (Australia, WWI or WWII)
- AIFS – Advanced Indirect Fire System
- AIFV – Armored Infantry Fighting Vehicle
- AIPS – Advanced Integrated Propulsion System (US)
- AIS – Automatic Identification System (US NAVY)
  - AIS – Automated Information System
- AIT – Alteration Installation Team
  - AIT – Advanced Information Technology
  - AIT – Advanced Individual Training
- AITAS – ATRRS Internet Training Application System
- AK – Acknowledgement
- AKO – Army Knowledge Online
- AL&T – Acquisition, Logistics, and Technology
- ALAAVS – Advanced Light Armored/Amphibious Vehicle System (US)
- ALC – Advanced Land Combat (US)
- ALDT – Administrative and Logistics Down Time
- ALICE – All-purpose lightweight individual carrying equipment
- ALMC – U.S. Army Logistics Management College
- ALO – AEGIS Light Off
- ALS – Advanced Laying System
- ALS – Advanced Lighting System (flight deck)
- ALSV – Armored logistics support vehicle
- ALT – Armored launching turret
- ALWT – Advanced Lightweight Torpedo
- AM – Acquisition Manager
- AMBL – Air Maneuver Battle Lab
- AMC – United States Army Materiel Command
- AMCAC – United States Army Materiel Command Acquisition Center
- AMC – Advanced Mortar Carrier (Turkey)
  - AMC – Air Mobility Command (US)
- AMCCOM – Armament Munitions and Chemical Command
- AMCOM – Aviation and Missile Command
- AMDBD – Army Medical Department Board
- AMEDD – Army Medical Department
- AMEDDC&S – Army Medical Department Center & School
- AMDR – Air and Missile Defense Radar
- AMDS – Anti-Missile Discarding Sabot
- AMF – Amphibische Mehrzweck-Fahrzeuge (multipurpose amphibious vehicle)
- AML – Automitrailleuse Légère (light armored car)
- AMLCD – Active-Matrix Liquid Crystal Display
- AMN – Afghanistan Mission Network
- AMOS – Advanced Mortar System
- AMPS – Afloat Master Planning System (US NAVY)
- AMPV – Armored Multi-Purpose Vehicle
- AMR – Anti-materiel rifle
  - AMR – Automitrailleuse de Reconnaissance
- AMRAAM – Advanced Medium Range Air-to-Air Missile
- AMRDEC – Air and Missile Research, Development, and Engineering Center
- AMRWS – Advanced Multi-Role Weapon Station
- AMS – Armored Mortar System
- AMSAA – Army Materiel Systems Analysis Activity
- AMSEC – Army Modeling and Simulation Executive Council
- AMS-H – Advanced Missile System – Heavy
- AMSO – Army Modeling and Simulation Office
- AMX – Atelier de Construction d'Issy-les-Moulineaux
- ANAD – Anniston Army Depot
- ANR – Active Noise Reduction
- ANZAC – Australia and New Zealand Army Corps
- ANZUS – Australia New Zealand United States Treaty
- AO – Area of Operations
  - AO – Authorizing Official
- AoA – Add-on Armor
  - AoA – Avenue of Approach
- AODR – Authorizing Official Designated Representative
- AOI – Arab Organization for Industrialization
- AOP – Air observation post
- AOS – Add-on stabilization
- AOTR – Abbreviated Operational Test Report
- AP – Anti-Personnel
- AP – Armor-Piercing
- APA – Army Procurement Appropriation
- APAM – Anti-Personnel, Anti-Matériel
- APBC – Armor-Piercing Ballistic Cap
- APC – Army Personnel Centre
  - APC – Armored Personnel Carrier
  - APC – Armor-Piercing Capped
- APCBC – Armor-Piercing Capped Ballistic Cap
- APC-T – Armor-Piercing Capped – Tracer
- APCT-BF – Armor-Piercing Capped Tracer – Base Fuse
- APCNR – Armor-Piercing Composite Non-Rigid
- APCR – Armor-Piercing Composite Rigid
- APCRBC – Armor-Piercing Composite Rigid Ballistic Cap
- APDS – Armor-Piercing Discarding Sabot
- APDS-T – Armor-Piercing Discarding Sabot – Tracer
- APE – Amphibisches Pionier-Erkundungsfahrzeug (amphibious front-line reconnaissance vehicle)
- APEP – Armor-Piercing Enhancement Program
- APERS – Anti-Personnel
- APERS-T – Anti-Personnel Tracer
- APFIDS – Armor-Piercing Fragmentation Incendiary Discarding Sabot
- APFSDS – Armor-Piercing Fin-Stabilized Discarding Sabot
- APFSDS-T – Armor-Piercing Fin-Stabilized Discarding Sabot – Tracer
- APFSDS-P – Armor-Piercing Fin-stabilized Discarding Sabot - Practice
- APFSDS-DU – Armor-Piercing Fin-Stabilized Discarding Sabot - Depleted Uranium
- APG – Aberdeen Proving Grounds
- APGM – Autonomous Precision-Guided Munition
- APHC – Armor-Piercing Hard Core
- APHE – Armor-Piercing High-Explosive
- API – Armor-Piercing Incendiary
- API-T – Armor-Piercing Incendiary – Tracer
- APM – Anti-Personnel Mine
- APMI – Accelerated Precision Mortar Initiative
- APOD – Aerial Port Of Debarkation
- APS – Advanced Propulsion System
  - APS – Artillery Pointing System
- APSE – Armor-Piercing Secondary Effect
- APSE-T – Armor-Piercing Secondary Effect – Tracer
- AP-T – Armor-Piercing – Tracer
- APTE – Abrams Power Train Evolution (US)
- APU – Auxiliary Power Unit
- APV – Armored Patrol Vehicle
- AR – ArmaLite rifle
  - AR – Assault Rifle
- AR/AAV – Armored Reconnaissance/Airborne Assault Vehicle (US)
- ARB – Armored Robots
- ARBDD – Armored Robots for Bomb Detection and Disposal
- ARD – Anti-Reflective Device
- ARDEC – Armament Research, Development and Engineering Center
- ARDNOT – Automatic Day/Night Optical Tracker
- ARE – Atelier de Construction Roanne
- AREG – Army Regulation
- ARETS – Armor Remote Target System
- ARFORGEN – Army Force Generation
- ARL – Army Research Laboratory (US)
- ARM – Anti-Radiation Missile
- ARMAD – Armored and Mechanized Unit Air Defense
- ARMD – Armored
- ARMSCOR – Armament Manufacturing Corporation (South Africa)
- ARMVAL – Anti-armor Vehicle Evaluation (US)
- ARNG – Army National Guard
- AROC – Army Requirements Oversight Council
- ARP – Anti-Radiation Projectile
  - ARP – Armored Repair Plates
- ARRADCOM – Armament Research and Development Command
- ARRV – Armored Repair and Recovery Vehicle
- ARSV – Armored reconnaissance scout vehicle (US)
- ART – Armored Recon Transport
- ARV – Armored Recovery Vehicle or Armed Robotic Vehicle (XM1219)
- ARTY – Artillery
- ASA – Advanced security agency
- ASAP – As soon as possible
- ASARC – Army Systems Acquisition Review Council
- ASCOD – Austrian Spanish Co-operative Development
- ASCOPE – Areas, Structures, Capabilities, Organizations, People, and Events
- ASE – Aircraft Survivability Equipment
- ASI – Additional Skill Identifier
- ASIP – Advanced System Improvement Program
- ASM – Air-to-Surface Missile
- ASP – Automatic, Self-Powered
  - ASP – Automation Support Plan
- AST – ATEC System Team
- ASTROS – Artillery Saturation Rocket System (Brazil)
- ASV – Armored security vehicle (US)
  - ASV – Ammunition supply vehicle
  - ASV – Army supply vehicle
- ASYMWAR – Asymmetric warfare
- AT – Anti-tank
  - AT – Ape tape
- AT&L – Acquisition, technology, and logistics
- ATACMS – Army Tactical Missile System
- ATACS – Advanced Tank Cannon System (US)
- ATAS – Automatic Target Acquisition System
- ATC – Aberdeen Test Center
- ATCAS – Advanced Towed Cannon System
- ATCCS – Army Tactical Command and Control System
- ATD – Advanced Technology Demonstration
  - ATD – Advanced Technology Demonstrator (US)
  - ATD – Automatic Target Detection
- ATDT – Automatic Target Detection and Tracking
- ATDU – Armored Trials and Development Unit (UK)
- ATE – Advanced Technology Engine
- ATE – Automatic Test Equipment
- ATEC – Army Test and Evaluation Command
- ATFCS – Automated Targeting and Fire Control System
- ATG – Anti-Tank Gun
- ATGL – Anti-Tank Grenade Launcher
- ATGM – Anti-Tank Guided Missile
- ATGW – Anti-Tank Guided Weapon
- ATIRS – Army Test Incident Reporting System
- ATK – Alliant Techsystems
- ATLAS – Advanced Technology Light Artillery System
- ATLV – Artillery Target Location Vehicle
- ATM – Anti-Tank Mine
- ATO – Authorization To Operate
- ATR-EDS – Automotive Test Rig – Electric Drive System
- ATS – Atelier de Construction de Tarbes
- ATSA – ATEC Threat Support Activity
- ATTC – All Terrain Tracked Carrier
- ATTS – Air Transportable Towed System
  - ATTS – Automatic Target Tracking System
- ATV – All-Terrain Vehicle
- ATV – Armored TOW Vehicle (Turkey)
- AUDS – Anti-UAV Defense System
- AUG – Armee Universal Gewehr
- AUSA – Association of the U.S. Army
- AUTL – Army Universal Task List
- AV – Audio-Visual
- AVGP – Armored Vehicle General Purpose (Canada)
- AVH – Armored Vehicle Heavy
- AVL – Armored Vehicle Light
- AVLB – Armored vehicle-launched bridge
- AVM – Armored Vehicle Medium
- AVN – Aviation
- AVR – Armored Vehicle Reconnaissance
- AVRE – Armored Vehicle Royal Engineers (UK)
- AVT – Advanced Vehicle Technologies (US)
- AVTD – Aviation Test Directorate
- AWACS – Airborne Warning and Control System
- AWE – Advanced Warfighting Experiment
- AWOL – Absent Without Official Leave
- AWS – Alternative Work Schedule
- AZ – Azimuth

== B ==
- BAe – British Aerospace
- BAI – Battlefield Air interdiction
- BAMCIS – Begin the Planning, Arrange Recon, Make Recon, Complete Planning, Issue Order, Supervise
- BAR – M1918 Browning Automatic Rifle
- BARCAP – Barrier Combat Air Patrol
- BARF – Base And Range Facilities
- BARV – Beach Armored Recovery Vehicle
- BAS – Battlefield Automated System
- BAS – Basic Allowance for Substance
- BASE – British Aerospace Systems and Equipment
- BASOPS – Base Operations
- BATES – Battlefield Artillery Target Engagement System
- BAT – Biometrics Automated Toolset
- BAWS – Biological Agent Warning System
- BB – Base Bleed
- BB – Battleship
- BBSP – Blowback Shifted Pulse
- BC – Battery Commander or Battalion Commander
- BC – Battlecruiser
- BCC – Battery Control Centre
- BCIS – Battlefield Combat Identification System
- BCP – Battery Command Post
- BCS – Bridge Crossing Simulator
- BCT – Brigade Combat Team (US)
- BCT – Basic Combat Training
- BCV – Battle Command Vehicle
- BD – Base Detonating
- BDA – Browning Double Action or Bomb Damage Assessment
- BDAR – Battle Damage Assessment And Repair
- BDE – Brigade
- BDM – Bunker Defeat Munition
- BDU – Battle Dress Uniform
- BE – Base Ejection
- BFA – Blank-Firing Adaptor or Blank-Firing Attachment
- BFV – Bradley Fighting Vehicle
- BFVS – Bradley Fighting Vehicle System
- BG – Border Guard or Brigadier General
- BG – Bombardment Group
- BH – Black Hot
- BHOT – Black Hot (image in a thermal sight)
- bhp – Brake Horsepower
- BIFF – Battlefield Identification Friend or Foe
- BII – Basic Issued Item
- BILL – Bofors, infantry, light and lethal, referring to RBS 56 BILL or RBS 56B BILL 2
- BIT – Built-In Test
- BIT/ST – Built-In Test/Self-Test
- BITE – Built-in test equipment
- BL – Blank
- BL-T – Black tracer
- BLITS – Beta lighted infantry telescope system
- BLOS – Beyond Line-Of-Sight
- BL-T – Blank – Tracer
- BLT – Battalion Landing Team
- BLR – Blindado Ligero de Ruedas
- BLRIP – Beyond Low-Rate Initial Production
- BLWE – Battle Lab Warfighting Experiment
- BM – Brigade Major
- BMC4I – Battle Management Command, Control, Communications, Computers, and Intelligence
- BMD – Ballisitic Missile Defense
- BMF – Belgian Mechanical Fabrication
- BML – Battle management language
- BMNT – Begin Morning Nautical Twilight
- BMP – Pronounced "bimp". Former Warsaw Pact IFVs including BMP-1, BMP-2, BMP-3, etc.
- BMR – Blindado Medio de Ruedas
- BMS – Battalion Mortar System
- BMS – Battlefield Management System
- BNCC (USAF) – Base network control center
- BN – Battalion
- BNS – BILL Night Sight
- BO – Blackout
- BOCV – Battery Operations Center vehicle
- BOG-Dwell – Boots on the Ground – Dwell (down time)
- BOI – Basis Of Issue
- BOL – Bearing-only launch
- BOLTS – Bolt-On Loading Tray System
- BOIP – Basis Of Issue Plan
- BOSS – Ballistic Optimizing Shooting System
- BOSS – Better Opportunity for Single Soldiers
- BPI – Bolt Position Indicator
- BPS – Battery Power Source
- BPT – Be Prepared To
- BPS – Battery Power Source
- BR – Battle Rifle
- BRAC – Base Realignment And Closure
- BRDEC – Belvoir Research and Development Engineering Center
- BRKR – Breaker
- BRS – Brake Release Switch
- BRSGHT – Boresight
- BRT – Bright or Brightness
- BSA – Base Support Agreement
- BSB – Brigade Support Battalion
- BSD – Boresight Device
- BSP – Bright Source Protection
- BSSG – Brigade Service Support Group
- BST – Basic Skills Trainer
- BT – Boat Tail
- BT – Bullet Trap
- BTA – Best Technical Approach
- BTA – Battle Training Area
- BTRY – Battery
- BTU – Bullet Trap Universal
- BTU – British Thermal Unit
- BTY – Battery
- BUA – BILL Under Armor or Built-Up Area
- BUB – Battlefield Update Briefing
- BW – Biological Warfare
- BW – Black/White
- BX – Bionix AFV

== C ==
- C/G – Contractor or Government
- C/J – Communications/Jam
- C&L – Capabilities and Limitations
- C2 – Command and Control
- C2E – Continuous Comprehensive Evaluation
- C2I – Command, Control, and Intelligence
- C2V – Command and Control Vehicle
- C3 – Command, Control, and Communications
- C3I – Command, Control, Communications, and Intelligence
- C4 – Composition C-4
- C4I – Command Control, Communications, Computers, Intelligence
- C4IEWS – Command, Control, Communications, Computer, Intelligence, Electronic Warfare and Sensors
- C4ISR – Command, Control, Communications, Computer, Intelligence, Surveillance, and Reconnaissance
- C4ISTAR – Command, Control, Communications, Computers, Intelligence, Surveillance, Target acquisition, And Reconnaissance
- C5I – Command, Control, Communications, Computers, Collaboration and Intelligence
- C6ISR – Command, Control, Communications, Computers, Cyber-defense, Combat systems and intelligence, Surveillance, and Reconnaissance
- CA – Certification Authority
- CAA – Center for Army Analysis
- CAB – Combat Aviation Battalion
  - CAB – Combat Action Badge
- CAC – Common Access Card
- CACDA – Combined Arms Combat Development (US Army)
- CAD – Computer-Assisted Design
  - CAD – Chemical Agent Detector
- CAE – Component Acquisition Executive
- CAG – Commander Air Group
- CAGEC – Commercial And Government Entity Code
- CAIV – Cost As an Independent Variable
- CAL – Canadian Arsenals Limited
  - CAL – Caliber
- CALIB – Calibration
- CAN – Control Area Network
- CAP – Crisis Action Planning
  - CAP – Civil Air Patrol (USAF civilian auxiliary)
  - CAP – Combat Air Patrol
  - CAP – Combustible Augmented Plasma
  - CAP – Covering Agent Program
- CAR – Corrective Action Report
  - CAR – Combined Arms Rehearsal
- CARRV – Challenger Armored Repair and Recovery Vehicle
- CART – Corrective Action Review Team
- CAS – Close Air Support
- CASEVAC – Casualty Evacuation
- CASTFOREM – Combined Arms Task Force Evaluation Model
- CAT-FCS – Command Adjusted Trajectory - Fire-Control System (US)
- CAT-LCV – Combined Arms Team - Lightweight Combat Vehicle (US)
- CATK – Counter Attack
- CATT – Combined Arms Tactical Trainer (UK)
- CATT-B – Component Advanced Technology TestBed (US)
- CAV – Cavalry
  - CAV – Composite Armored Vehicle (US)
- CAWS – Cannon Artillery Weapons Systems (US)
- CAX – Combined Arms Exercise
- CB – Heavy Cruiser
- CBIT – Continuous Built-In Test (BIT)
- CBMS – Chemical Biological Mass Spectrometer
- CPDP – Chemical, Biological Defense Program
- CBR – Chemical, Biological, Radiological
- CBRNE – Chemical, Biological, Radiological, Nuclear, Explosive
- CBS – Corps Battle Simulator
- CBT – Computer Based Training
- CBTDEV – Combat Developer
- CBW – Chemical and Biological Warfare
- CC – Close Combat
- CCAWS – Close Combat Anti-Armor Weapons Systems
- CCB – Configuration Control Board
- CCC – Combustible Cartridge Case
- CCD – Charge-Coupled Device
- CCMA – Crew-Correctable Maintenance Action
- CCMD – Combatant Command
- CCIP – Constantly Computed Impact Point
- CCO – Close Combat Optic
- CCP – Casualty Collection Point
- CCP – Computer Control Panel
- CCR – Crown Copyright Reserved
- CCTV – Closed-Circuit Television
- CCU – Central Control Unit
  - CCU – Climate Control Unit
- CCV – Close Combat Vehicle
  - CCV – Command and Control Vehicle (US)
- CCV-L – Close Combat Vehicle – Light
- cd – Candela
- CDA – Combat Defensive Action
- CDD – Capability Development Document
- CDM – Coastal Defense Missile
- CDR – Commander
  - CDR – Critical Design Review
- CDRL – Contract Data Requirements List
- CDRT – Capabilities Development for Rapid Transition
- CDS – Configuration Data Set
- CDU – Command Display Unit
- CDU – Computer Display Unit
- CE – Chemical Energy
  - CE – Continuous Evaluation
- C/E – Crew/Enlisted (enlisted aircrew member)
- CEAC – Cost and Economic Analysis Center
- CECOM – Communications and Electronics Command
  - CECOM – Communications-Electronics Command
- CED – Contingency Exercise Deployment
- CEFO – Combat Equipment Fighting Order (webbing contents)
- CENTCOM – Central Command
- CENTO – Central Treaty Organization or Baghdad Pact
- CEOI – Communications electronics operating instruction
- CEP – Circular error probable
- CEPSARC – Concept Experimentation Program Schedule and Review Committee
- CERDEC – Communication and Electronics Research, Development, and Engineering Center
- CERTEX – Certification Exercise
- CES – Engineer Services Regiment (Sri Lanka)
- CEPP – Controlled effect police projectile
- CET – Combat engineer tractor
- CEU – Computer electronics unit
- CEV – Combat engineer vehicle
- CF – Canadian Forces
  - CF – Controlled Fragmentation
  - CF – Controlled fragmentation
- CFE – Conventional forces Europe
- CFLCC – Coalition Forces Land Component Command
- CFT – Cross Functional Teams
- CFV – Cavalry Fighting Vehicle (US)
- CG – Commanding General
- CGS – Crew Gunnery Simulator
  - CGS – Command and General Staff
- CHA – Cast Homogeneous Armor
- CHARM – Challenger Chieftain Armament
- CHEM – Chemical
- CHIP – Challenger Improvement Program
- CHS – Commander's Hand Station
- CI – Counter-Intelligence
  - CI – Commander's Interface
- CIC – Combat Information Centre
- CIE – Clothing and Individual Equipment
- CIFV – Composite Infantry Fighting Vehicle
- CIG – Cannon Interface Gear
- CILAS – Compagnie Industrielle des Lasers
- CINC – Commander In-Chief
- CINCAFCOM – Commander-In-Chief, African Command
- CINCCENTCOM – Commander-In-Chief, Central Command
- CINCAD – Commander-In-Chief, Aerospace Defense Command
- CINCAL – Commander-In-Chief, Alaska
- CINCCFC – Commander-In-Chief, Combined Forces Command
- CINCEUR – Commander-In-Chief, Europe
- CINCHAN – Commander-In-Chief, Channel (NATO)
- CINCLANT – Commander-In-Chief, Atlantic
- CINCLANTFLT – Commander-In-Chief, Atlantic Fleet
- CINCMAC – Commander-In-Chief, Military Airlift Command
- CINCNET – Commander-In-Chief, Network
- CINCNORAD – Commander-In-Chief, North American Aerospace Defense Command
- CINCNORTH – Commander-In-Chief, Pacific
- CINCRED – Commander-In-Chief, Readiness Command
- CINCSOUTH – Commander-In-Chief, Southern Command
- CINCSTRIKE – Commander-In-Chief, Strike Command
- CINCUNC – Commander-In-Chief, United Nations Command
- CINCUNK – Commander-In-Chief, United Nations Force, Korea
- CINCUSAFE – Commander-In-Chief, U.S. Air Forces, Europe
- CINCUSAREUR – Commander-In-Chief, Army, Europe
- CINCUSNAVEUR – Commander-In-Chief, U.S. Naval Forces, Europe
- CIO – Chief Information Officer
- CIP – Combat Identification Panel
- CIPR – Concept In-Process Review
- CIS – Chartered Industries of Singapore
- CIS – Commonwealth of Independent States
- CITV – Commander's Independent Thermal Viewer (US)
- CIU – Commanders Interface Unit
- CIWS – Close-In Weapons System
- CIV – Civilian
- CJCS – Chairman, Joint Chiefs of Staff
- CJCSI – Chairman of the Joint Chiefs of Staff Instruction
- CJCSM – Chairman of the Joint Chiefs of Staff Manual
- CJTF – Commander, Joint Task Force
- CKPT – Cockpit
- CL – Light Cruiser
- CLAMS – Clear Lane Marking System (US)
- CLASS – Computerized Laser Sight System
- CLAWS – Close Combat Light Armor Weapon System (US)
  - CLAWS – Container Launched Attack Weapon System
- CLM-E – Continuous Learning Modules – Engineering
- CLGP – Cannon-Launched Guided Projectile (US)
- CLOE – Common Logistics Operating Environment
- CLOS – Command to Line Of Sight
- CLS – Combat Life Support
  - CLS – Contract Logistics Support
- CLU – Command Launch Unit (as used in FGM-148 Javelin)
- CM – Counter Measures
- CMD – Command
- CM – Color-Marking or "continue mission"
- CMP – Configuration Management Plan
- CMV – Combat Mobility Vehicle
- CMS – Common Missile System
  - CMS – Compact Modular Sight
- CMT – Cadmium–Mercury Telluride
- CMV – Combat Mobility Vehicle (US)
- CNCE – Communications Network Control Element
- CNP – Candidate Nomination Proposals
- CNVD – Clip-on Night Vision Device
- COA – Course Of Action
- COB – Close of Business
- CO – Commanding officer
- Co – Company
- COA – Course of Action
- COB – Close of Business
- COC – Chain of Command
- COCOM – Combatant Commander
- COE – Chief of Engineers
- COG – Course Over Ground
- COI – Critical Operational Issue
- COIC – Critical Operational Issues and Criteria
- COIN – Counterinsurgency
- COM/INT – Communications/Intercept
- COMARLANT – Commander, U.S. Army Forces, Atlantic
- COMDCAEUR – Commander, Defense Communications Agency, Europe
- COMINT – Communications Jamming
- COMJTF – Commander, Joint Task Force
- COMPUSEC - Computer Security
- COMOPTEVFOR – Commander, Operational Test and Evaluation Force
- COMSAT – Communications Satellite
- COMSEC- Communications Security
- COMVAT – Combat Vehicles Armament Technology (US)
- COMZ – Communications Zone
- CONOPS – Concept of Operations
- CONUS – Continental United States
- COP – Combat Outpost
- COS – Chief of Section
- CoS – Chief of Staff
- COSCOM – Corps Support Command (US Army)
- COTAC – Conduite de Tir Automatique pour Char (tank automatic fire)
- COTS – Commercial-Off-The-Shelf
- COV – Counter Obstacle Vehicle (US)
- COZ – Central Operations Zone
  - COZ – Controlled Operations Zone
- CoZ – Counteroffensive Zone
- CP – Command Post
  - CP – Concrete-Piercing
- CPAWS - Charged Particle Weapon System
- CPD – Capability Production Document
- CPDU – Computer Power Distribution Unit
- CPL – Corporal
- CPO – Civilian Personnel Office
- CPOC – Civilian Personnel Operations Center
- CPR – Common Practice Round
- CPS – Cardinal Points Specification (UK)
- CPV – Command Post Vehicle
- CPV – Commander's Panoramic Viewer
- CPVEU – Commander's Panoramic Viewer Electronics Unit
- CPVSA – Commander's Panoramic Viewer Sensor Assembly
- CPX – Command Post Exercise
- CQB – Close Quarters Battle
- CQBR – Close-Quarters Battle Receiver
- CR – Capability Requirement
  - CR – Sri Lanka Army Commando Regiment
- CRB – Configuration Review Board
  - CRB – Capstone Requirements Document
- C-RDAP – Civilian – Rotational Developmental Assignment Program
- CRISAT – Collaborative Research into Small Arms Technology
- CRM – Composite Risk Management (US)
- CRMP – Computer Resource Management Plan
- CROWS – Common Remotely Operated Weapon Station
- CRR – Carro de Reconhecimento Sobre Rodas (reconnaissance tracking scout car)
- CRT – Cathode Ray Tube
- CRTC – Cold Regions Test Center
- CRWG – Computer Resources Working Group
- CRU – Cable Reel Unit

- CRUDIV– Cruiser Division
- CS – Communications Subsystem
  - CS – Confined Space
  - CS – Communications Squadron (USAF)
- CSA – Chief of Staff (Army)
- CSAD – Commander's Situational Awareness Display
- CSC – Computer Software Concept
- CSCI – Computer Software Configuration Item
- CSB – Combat Support Boat
- CSE – Chargeable to Support Equipment
- CSF – Combined Service Forces
- CSI – computer-Synthesized Image
- CSM – Command Sergeant Major
- CSS – Combat Service Support
  - CSS – Computer Sighting System
- CSSBL – Combat Service Support Battle Lab
- CSSD – Combat Service Support Detachment
- CT – Customer Test
- CTA – Case Telescoped Ammunition
- CTD – Concept Technology Demonstrator
- CTC – Combat Training Center
- CTEA – Cost and Training Effectiveness Analysis
- CTEIP – Central Test and Evaluation Improvement Program
- CTG – Cartridge
- CTI – Central Tire Inflation
- CTIS – Central Tire Inflation System
- CTO – Central Treaty Organization or Baghdad Pact
- CTP – Critical Technical Parameter
- CTSF – Central Technical Support Facility
- CTR – Close Target Recce
  - CTR – Contractor
- CTRA – Carro de Transporte Sobre Rodas Anfibo (amphibious tracking scout car)
- CTT – Challenger Training Tank
- CUOPS – Current Operations
- CUP – Control Unit Panel
- CV – Commander's Vehicle
  - CV – Aircraft Carrier
- CV90 – Combat Vehicle 90
- CVAST – Combat Vehicle Armament System Technology (US)
- CVC – Combat Vehicle Crewman's
- CVR-T – Combat Vehicle Reconnaissance - Tracked (UK)
- CVR-W – Combat Vehicle Reconnaissance - Wheeled (UK)
- CVRDE – Combat Vehicle Research and Development Establishment (India)
- CVT – Controlled Variable Time
- CVTTS – Combat Vehicle Targeting System
- CW – Chemical Warfare
- CWA – Chemical Warfare Agent
- CWBS – Contract Work Breakdown Structure
- CWG – Communications Working Group
- CWO – Chief Warrant Officer
- CWR – Continuous Wave radar
- CWS – Cupola Weapon Station
- CY – Calendar Year

== D ==
- D&O – Doctrinal and Organizational
- DA – Department of the Army
- DA – Double Action
- DAA – Designated Approving Authority
- DAB – Defense Acquisition Board
- DAC – DEFCOM Analysis Cover
- DAE – Defense Acquisition Executive
- DAES – Defense Acquisition Evaluations System
- DAG – Data Authentication Group
- DAGR – Defense Advanced GPS Receiver
- DAHA – Dual-Axis Head Assembly
- DAIG – Department of the Army Inspector General
- DA IPR – DA In-Process Review
- DAO – Double Action Only
- DAP – Designated Acquisition Program
- DAP – Distant Aiming Point
- DAPS – Dismounted Assured P(osition, Navigation, Timing,) System
- DARCOM – US Army Matériel Development and Readiness Command
- DAREOD – Damaged Airfield Reconnaissance Explosive Ordnance Disposal
- DARPA – Defense Advanced Research Projects Agency (US)
- DARPANET – DARPA Network
- DAS – Deep Air Support
- DAS Director of the Army Staff
- DAS – Defensive Aids System/suite
- DASP – Demountable Artillery Surveillance Pod
- DATO – Denial Authority To Operate
- DAU – Defense Acquisition University
- DAWIA – Defense Acquisition Workforce Improvement Act
- DB – Database
- DB – Delayed-Blowback
- DBBL – Dismounted Battle Battle Lab
- DC – Data Collector
- DC – Direct Current
- DCA – Digital Control Assembly
- DCA – Défense Contre Avions (anti-aircraft)
- DCAS – Defense Contract Administration Services
- DCB – Driver's Control Box
- DCCT – Dismounted Close Combat Trainer
- DCD – Directorate of Combat Developments
- DCG – Deputy Commanding General
- DCMA – Defense Contract Management Agency
- DCR – DOTMLPF Change Recommendation
- DCS – Diagnostic Control Software
- DD – Drivers Display
- DD – Detroit Diesel
- DD – Destroyer
- DDA – Detroit Diesel Allison
- DDS – Department of Defense Support
- DDU – Digital Display Unit
- DE – Data Element
- DEAD – Destruction of Enemy Air Defense
- DECA – Digital Electronic Control Assembly
- DEFA – direction des études et fabrications d'armement
- DEFCON – Defense Readiness Condition
- DEM/VAL – Demonstration and Validation (phase)
- DEP – Deputy
- DEPSECDEF – Deputy Secretary of Defense
- DERA – Defence Evaluation and Research Agency (UK)
- DESO – Defense Export Sales Organization (UK)
- DET – Detachment
- DEV – Developer
- DFAC – Dining Facility (US)
- DFCS – Digital Fire-Control System
- DFSV – Direct Fire Support Vehicle
- DFV – Desert Fighting Vehicle
- DDG – Guided Missile Destroyer
- DG – Door Gunner (Helicopter)
- DHA – Display Head Assembly
- DHSS – Data Handling Subsystem
- DIA – Defense Intelligence Agency (US)
- DIACAP – Department of Defense Information Assurance Certification and Accreditation Process
- DIAG – Diagnostic
- DICON – Defense Industries Corporation of Nigeria
- DID – Data Item Description
- DIMM – Dimmer
- DIP – Driver Instrument Panel
- DIPR – Detailed Test Plan in-Process Review
- DIR – Director
- DIS – Distributed Interactive Simulation
- DISA – Defense Information Systems Agency
- DISCOM – Division Support Command
- DISNET – Defense Integrated Secure Network
- DISUM – Daily Intelligence Summary
- DIVARTY – Division Artillery
- DLA – Defense Logistics Agency
- DMC – Digital Magnetic Compass
- DMR – Designated marksman rifle
- DMR – Detect, Mitigate, Recover
- DMSO – Defense Modeling and Simulation Office
- DMU – Distance Measurement Unit
- DN – Data Net
- DNRS – day/night range sight
- DoD – Department of Defense (US)
- DODD – Department of Defense Directive
- DODI – Department of Defense Instruction
- DODIG – Department of Defense Inspector General
- DOD-STD – Department of Defense Standard
- DOE – Design of Experiments
- DOIM – Directorate of Information Management (US Army)
- DOP – Department of Productivity
- DOS – Date of Separation
- DOT&E – Director, Operational Test and Evaluation
- DOTMLPF – Doctrine, Organization, Training, Materiel, Leadership and Education, Personnel and Facilities
- DOTSP – Doctrinal and Organizational Test Support Package
- DP – Data Processing
- DP – demonstration purpose
- DP – dual purpose
- DPA – Defence Procurement Agency (UK)
- DPE – Data Processing Equipment (or Element)4
- DPEO – Deputy Program Executive Officer
- DPG – Defense Planning Guidance
- DPM – Deputy Program Manager
- DPM – Deputy Project Manager
- DPM – Deputy Product Manager
- DPICM – Dual-Purpose Improved Conventional Munition (US)
- DPTR – diopter
- DPW – Directorate of Public Works
- DQT – Development Qualification Testing
- DR – Data Requirement
- DR – Decision Review
- DRA – Defence Research Agency (UK)
- DRB – Design Review Board
- DRI – Detection, Recognition, & Identification
- DRM – Director of Resource Management
- DROPS – demountable rack offloading and pick-up system
- DROS – Date of Return Overseas (US)
- DRP – Data Reduction Plan
- DRT – Design Review Team
- DS – Direct Support
- DS/GS – Direct Support/General Support
- DS/T – practice discarding sabot/tracer
- DSA – Defense Supply Agency
- DSACS – direct support armored cannon system (US)
- DSAD – Driver's Situational Awareness Display
- DSAU – Diagnostic Signal Acquisition Unit
- DSETS – direct support electrical test system
- DSM – Data Source Matrix
- DSMC – Defense Systems Management College
- DSN – Defense Switched Network
- DSNET – Defense Secure Network
- DSO – Defence Sales Organisation
- DSRV – Deep Submergence Rescue Vehicle (US)
- DSS – Direct Support System
- DSSW – Defense Services Support – Washington
- DST – Direct Support Team
- DSWS – Division Support Weapon System
- DT – Developmental Test
- DT&E – Developmental Test and Evaluation
- DTAT – Direction Technique des Armements Terrestres
- DTC – Developmental Test Command
- DTG – Date Time Group
- DTIC – Defense Technical information Center
- DTIP – Developmental Test Instrumentation Program
- DTP – Detailed Test Plan
- DTRR – Developmental Test Readiness Review
- DTT – Doctrinal and Tactical Training
- DTT – driver training tank
- DTV – Driver's Thermal Viewer
- DU – Display Unit / Detector Unit
- DU – depleted uranium
- DUA TST – Directory User Agent Tactical Support Team
- DUSA – Deputy Under Secretary of the Army
- DUSA-TE – Deputy Under Secretary of the Army for Test Evaluation
- DUSD – Deputy Under Secretary of Defense
- DUSD(ATL) – Deputy Under Secretary of Defense for Acquisition, Technology, and Logistics
- DV – demining vehicle
- DVC – Day Video Camera
- DVE – driver's vision enhancer
- DVO – Direct Vision Optics
- DVO – Driver, Vehicle, and Operator (drop zone)
- DWFK – deep water fording kit
- DZ – drop zone

== E ==
- EAAK – Enhanced Appliqué Armor Kit (US)
- EAC – Enhanced Attitude Control (warthog A10)
- EAS – End of Active Service
- EAOS – Enhanced Artillery Observation System
- EBG – Engin Blindé Génie (armoured combat vehicle)
- EBR – Engin Blindé de Reconnaissance (armoured reconnaissance vehicle)
- EBRC – Engine Blindé à roues de Contact
- EC – Enhanced Carbine
- ECB – Engineering and Construction Bulletins
- ECM – Electronic countermeasures
- ECOS – Enhanced Combat Optical Sight
- ECS – Environmental Control Subsystem
- ECV – Enhanced Capacity Vehicle
- EDD – Explosive Detonation Disruption
- EDS – Electric Drive System
- EFAB – Etablissement d'Etudes et de Fabrications d'Armement de Bourges
- EFC – equivalent full charge
- EFCR – equivalent full charge rounds
- EFM – Explosives Factory Maribyrnong
- EFP – Expanded Feasibility Phase
- EFP – Explosively Formed Penetrator
- EFV – Expeditionary Fighting Vehicle (New name for AAAV)
- EFVS – Electronic Fighting Vehicle System (US)
- EG – External Gun
- EGLM – Enhanced Grenade Launcher Module
- EI – Engineering and Installation
- EIS – Engineering and Installation Squadron
- EI SIT – Engineering and Installation Site Implementation Team
- ELB – Extended Life Barrel
- ELEC – Electrical, Electric
- ELEK – Electronic
- ELEX – Electronics
- ELKE – Elevated Kinetic Energy Weapon (US)
- ELSAP – Elektronische Schiessanlage für Panzer (electronic fire system for tanks)
- EM – electromagnetic
- EMALS – Electromagnetic Aircraft Launcher System
- EMC – Executive Management Committee
- EMD – Engineering and Manufacturing Development
- EMDG – Euromissile Dynamics Group
- EMEW – Electromagnet Explosive Warhead
- EMG – externally mounted gun
- EMP – electromagnetic pulse
- EMPG – Electromagnetic Pulse Grenade
- EMSEC – Emissions Security
- ENGESA – Engesa Engenheiros Especializados (Brazil)
- EOC – Essential Operational Capability
- EOD – Explosive Ordnance Disposal
- EOR – Explosive Ordnance Reconnaissance
- EOTS – Electro-Optical Targeting System
- EOW – End of Watch
- EPC – Electronic plane conversion
- EPC – Engin Principal de Combat (future main battle tank)
- EPG – Enhanced Performance Grenade
- EPG – European Production Group
- EPG – European Programme Group
- EPS – Electrical Power Subsystem
- EPU – Electronics Processing Unit
- ER – enhanced radiation
- ER – extended range
- ERA – explosive reactive armour
- ERA – extended range ammunition
- ERC – Engin de Reconnaissance Canon
- ERFB – extended range full-bore
- ERFB-BB – extended range full-bore – base bleed
- ERGFCDS – Extended Range Gunnery Fire-Control Demonstration System
- ERGP – extended range guided projectile
- ERMIS – Extended Range Modification Integration System
- ERP – Extended Range Projectile
- ERSC – extended range subcalibre
- ERV – emergency rescue vehicle
- ERV – Engineer Reconnaissance Vehicle
- ES – Extreme Spread
- ESAF – Electronic Safety and Arm Function
- ESD – Electronique Serge Dassault
- ESLDE – Eyesafe Laser Daylight Elbow
- ESPAWS – Enhanced Self-Propelled Artillery Weapon System (US)
- ESRS – electro-slag refined steel
- ETA – Estimated Time of Arrival
- ETC – ElectroThermal Cannon
- ETD – Estimated Time of Departure
- ETE – Estimated Time of Endurance
- ETM – Electronic Technical Manuals
- ETS – Elevated TOW System
- ETS – Engineer Tank System
- ETS – End of Term of Service (discharge date) (US)
- EW – electronic warfare
- EWK – Eisenwerke Kaiserslautern Gцppner
- EWS – external weapon station

== F ==
- FAAD – Forward Area Air Defense
- FAAR – AN/MPQ-49 Forward Area Alerting Radar
- FAARP – Forward Area Arming & Refueling Point
- FAASV – Field Artillery Ammunition Support Vehicle (US)
- FAC – Forward Air Control(er)
- FAC-A – Forward Air Control(er)-Airborne
- FACE – Field Artillery Computer Equipment
- FAL – Fusil Automatique Légère
- FAPDS – Frangible Armour-Piercing Discarding Sabot
- FARP – Forward Area Refueling Point
- FARS – field artillery rocket system
- FARV-A – Future Armored Resupply Vehicle – Artillery (US)
- FAST – Forward Area Support Team or Future Assault Shell Technology
- FAV – Fast Attack Vehicle (US)
- FBI – Federal Bureau of Investigation
- FBM – Fleet Ballistic Missile
- FBRV – Future Beach Recovery Vehicle (UK)
- FCC – Fire Command Centre
- FCC – Fire-Control Computer
- FCCVS – Future Close-Combat Vehicle System (US)
- FCE – fire-control equipment
- FCLV – Future Command and Liaison Vehicle (UK)
- FCS – fire-control system/subsystem
- FCS – Future Combat System
- FCU – Fire Control Unit
- FDC – fire direction centre
- FDCV – fire direction centre vehicle
- FDSWS – Future Direct Support Weapon System
- FEBA – Forward Edge of the Battle Area
- FEP – Firepower Enhancement Programme
- FET – Future Engineer Tank
- FFAR – Folding-Fin Aerial Rocket
- FFE – Fire for Effect
- FFR – Fitted For Radio
- FFSS – Future Fighting Soldier System
- FFW – Fitted For Wireless
- FG – field gun
- FH – field howitzer
- FIBUA – Fighting In Built-Up Areas
- FID – Foreign Internal Defense
- FIFV – Future Infantry Fighting Vehicle (US)
- FIRM – Floating Integrated Rail Mount
- FIS – Fuze Interface System
- FISH – Fighting In Someone's House (UK) (Colloquial. Slang term for FIBUA)
- FIST – Future Integrated Soldier Technology (UK), Fire Support Team (US)
- FISTV – Fire Support Team Vehicle (US)
- FITOW – Further Improved TOW (US)
- FLEA – Frangible Low-Energy Ammunition (i.e. a fragmentation grenade or a low-yield IED)
- FLIR – forward-looking infra-red
- FLOT – forward line of own troops
- FLSW – Future Light Support Weapon
- FM – U.S. Army Field Manuals
- FM – Titanium tetrachloride (code designation)
- FMBS – Family of Muzzle Brake/Suppressors
- FMC – Food Machinery Corporation
- FMF – Fleet Marine Force
- FMJ – Full Metal Jacket
- FMJBT – Full Metal Jacket Boat Tail
- FMJLF – Full Metal Jacket Lead Free
- FMN – Federated Mission Networking
- FMPDS – Frangible Missile Piercing Discarding Sabot
- FMS – Foreign Military Sales
- FMTV – Family of Medium Tactical Vehicles
- FN – Fabrique Nationale (Manufacturer)
- FNG – Fucking New Guy
- FO – Forward Observer
- FOB – Forward Operating Base
- FOC – Full Operational Capability
- FOD – Foreign Object Damage (i.e., damage not caused by enemy fire. Includes bugs, dirt, etc.) (Aviation)
- FOG – Fibre Optic Gyro
- FOM – Fibre Optic Missile
- FOO – forward observation officer
- FORTIS – Forward Observation and Reconnaissance Thermal Imaging System
- FOTT – Follow on to TOW
- FOV – field of view
- FPA – Focal Plane Array
- FPL – Final Protective Fire
- FRAG – fragmentation
- FRAGO – FRAGmentary Order. (see OPORD)
- FRED – Field ration eating device (Australia)
- FRES – Future Rapid Effect System
- FROG – free rocket over ground
- FS – fire support element
- FSAT - full scale aerial target
- FSCL – fire support coordination line
- FSCM – fire support coordination measure
- FSCV – fire support combat vehicle
- FSED – full-scale engineering development (US)
- FSSG – Force Service Support Group
- FST – Future Soviet Tank/Follow-on Soviet Tank
- FSV – fire support vehicle
- FSV – Future Scout Vehicle (US)
- FTA – Frangible Training Ammunition
- FTMA – Future Tank Main Armament
- FTS – Future Tank Study
- FTT – Field Tactical Trainer
- FUBAR – Fouled/Fucked Up Beyond All Reason/Recognition/Repair
- FUE – First Unit Equipped
- FUG – Felderitц Usу Gépkosci
- FV – fighting vehicle
- FV/GCE – fighting vehicle gun control equipment
- FVDD – Fighting Vehicle Development Division
- FVRDE – Fighting Vehicle Research and Development Establishment (UK)
- FVS – Fighting Vehicle System (US)
- FVSC – Fighting Vehicle Systems Carrier (US)
- FY – fiscal year

== G ==
- g – gramme(s)
- G – gendarmerie
- GAMA – Gun automatic multiple ammunition
- GAO – General Accounting Office
- GAP – Gun aiming post
- GBAD – Ground-based air defence
- GCE – Gun control equipment
- GCT – Grande Cadence de Tir (high rate of fire)
- GCU – Gun control unit
- GCW – Gross combined weight (not "gross combat weight"). Gross vehicle weight (GVW) plus gross trailer weight (GTW).
- GD – General Dynamics
- GDLS – General Dynamics Land Systems
- GDU – Gun display unit
- GFE – Government-furnished equipment
- GH – Gun-howitzer
- GIGN- Groupe d'intervention de la Gendarmerie Nationale ("National Gendarmerie Intervention Group")
- GIAT – Groupement Industriel des Armements Terrestres
- GL – Grenade launcher
- GLATGM – Gun launched anti-tank guided missile
- GLC – Gun lay computer
- GLDNSM – Grenade launcher day–night sight mount
- GLH-H – Ground-Launched Hellfire-Heavy (US)
- GLLD – Ground Laser Locator Designator (US)
- GLS – Gesellschaft für Logistischen Service
- GM, MVO – General Motors, Military Vehicle Operations
- GMC – General Motors Corporation
- GMF — Ground Mobile Forces
- GMG – Grenade machine gun
- GMLRS – Guided Multiple Launch Rocket System
- GMS – Gun Management System
- GND – Ground (electrical)
- GOCO – government-owned, contractor-operated (US)
- GOP – General Out Post
- GP – General purpose
- GP – guided projectile
- GPMG – General-purpose machine gun
- GPO – Gun position officer
- GPS – Global Positioning System
- GPS – Gunner's primary sight
- GPSS – Gunner's primary sight subsystem
- GR – Gajaba Regiment (Sri Lanka)
- GREM – Grenade rifle entry munition
- GRIT – Group, range, indication, type of fire
- GRU – Glavnoe Razvedyvatel'noe Upravlenie, meaning main intelligence directorate
- GSR – General staff requirement (US)
- GSRS – General support rocket system
- GSG9- Grenzschutzgruppe 9 der Bundespolizei (Border Protection Group 9 of the Federal Police)
- GSOF – Georgian Special Operations Forces
- GST – General staff target
- GST – Gesellschaft für System-Technik
- GTCS – Gun test and control system
- GTG – Good to go
- GTI – German tank improvement
- GTW – Gross trailer weight
- GVW – Gross vehicle weight: curb weight plus max payload weight.
- GW – Gemunu Watch (Sri Lanka)
- GW – Guided weapon

== H ==
- h – hour(s)
- H&K – Heckler and Koch
- HAB – Heavy Assault Bridge (US)
- HAB – Heavy Artillery Brigade (UK)
- HAG – Heavy Artillery Gun
- HAHO – High Altitude High Opening
- HALO – High Altitude Low Opening, High Activity/Low Observable
- HAMS – Headquarters and Maintenance Squadron – Marine Aircraft Group (USMC)
- HAWK – Homing-All-the-Way-Killer (US)
- HB – heavy barrel
- HBAR – Heavy Barrel Assault Rifle
- HC – Hexachloroethane/zinc
- HC – high-capacity
- HC – Hollow Charge
- HCER – high-capacity extended range
- HCHE – high-capacity high-explosive
- HCT – HOT Compact Turret
- HDS – HOLOgraphic Diffraction Sight
- HE – high-explosive
- HE-APERS – high-explosive anti-personnel
- HE-FRAG – high-explosive fragmentation
- HE-FRAG-FS – high-explosive fragmentation – fin-stabilized
- HE-FS – high-explosive – fin-stabilized
- HE-S – high-explosive spotting
- HE-T – high-explosive tracer
- HE/PR – high-explosive practice
- HEAA – High-Explosive Anti-Armour
- HEAB – High-Explosive Air Burst
- HEAP – High-Explosive Armor-Piercing
- HEAP-T – high-explosive anti-personnel – tracer
- HEAT – high-explosive anti-tank
- HEAT-FS – high-explosive anti-tank fin-stabilized
- HEAT-MP – high-explosive anti-tank multipurpose
- HEAT-MP(P) – high-explosive anti-tank multipurpose (practice)
- HEAT-T – high-explosive anti-tank – tracer
- HEAT-T-HVY – high-explosive anti-tank – tracer – heavy
- HEAT-T-MP – high-explosive anti-tank – tracer – multipurpose
- HEAT-TP-T – high-explosive anti-tank – target practice – tracer
- HED-D – Hybrid Electric Drive – Demonstrator
- HEDP – high-explosive dual-purpose
- HEER – High-Explosive Extended Range (US)
- HEF – high-explosive fragmentation
- HEFT – High-Explosive Follow Through
- HEI – high-explosive incendiary
- HEIAP – High-explosive incendiary/armor-piercing ammunition
- HEIT – high-explosive incendiary tracer
- HEL – High-Energy Laser (US)
- HEL – Human Engineering Laboratory (US)
- HELP – Howitzer Extended Life Program (US)
- HEMAT – Heavy Expanded Mobility Ammunition Trailer (US)
- HEMP – High-Explosive Multi-Purpose
- HEMTT – Heavy Expanded Mobility Tactical Truck (US)
- HEP – high-explosive plastic
- HEP-T – high-explosive practice – tracer
- HEPD – high-explosive point detonating
- HERA – high-explosive rocket-assisted
- HESH – high-explosive squash head
- HESH-T – high-explosive squash head – tracer
- HET-PF – high-explosive tracer – percussion fuze
- HETF – High Explosive Time Fuzed
- HETS – Heavy Equipment Transport System
- HFCC – Howitzer Fire-Control Computer (US)
- HFHTB – Human Factors Howitzer TestBed (US)
- HFM – Heavy Force Modernisation (US)
- HIFV – Heavy Infantry Fighting Vehicle
- HIMAG – High-Mobility Agility Test Vehicle (US)
- HIMARS – High-Mobility Artillery Rocket System (US)
- HIP – Howitzer Improvement Program (US)
- HIRE – Hughes Infrared Equipment
- HITP – High-Ignition Temperature Propellant
- HIU – Heading Indicator Unit
- HMC – Howitzer Motor Carriage
- HMD – Helmet-Mounted Display
- HMG – Heavy Machine Gun
- HMH – Marine Heavy Helicopter Squadron
- HMLC – High-Mobility Load Carrier
- HML/A – Marine Light/Attack Helicopter Squadron
- HMM – Marine Medium Helicopter Squadron
- HMMWV – High Mobility Multipurpose Wheeled Vehicle
- HMX – Marine Special Mission Helicopter Squadron
- HOE – Holographic Optical Element
- HOT – Haute subsonique Optiquement Téléguidé
- How – Howitzer
- HP – High Power; Hollow Point
- hp – Horsepower
- HPFP – High-Performance Fragmentation Projectile
- HPS – Helmet Pointing System (or Sight)
- HPT – high-pressure test
- HRST – Helicopter Rope Suspension Technique
- HRU – Heading Reference Unit
- HS – Headquarters Squadron – Marine Wing Support Group (USMC)
- HSS – Hunter Sensor Suite
- HSTV(L) – High-Survivability Test Vehicle (Lightweight) (US)
- HTTB – High-Technology TestBed (US)
- HUD – Head-up display
- HVAP – high-velocity armour-piercing
- HVAP-T – high-velocity armour-piercing tracer
- HVAPDS – high-velocity armour-piercing discarding sabot
- HVAPDS-T – high-velocity armour-piercing discarding sabot – tracer
- HVAPFSDS – high-velocity armour-piercing fin-stabilised discarding sabot
- HVCC – High Velocity Canister Cartridge
- HVM – Hypervelocity Missile
- HVSS – horizontal volute spring suspension
- HVSW – Hypervelocity Support Weapon
- HVTP-T – high-velocity target practice – tracer
- HWSTD – High Water Speed Technology Demonstrator
- HYPAK – Hydraulic Power Assist Kit

== I ==
- I – Incendiary
- IAF – Indian Air Force
- IAFV – infantry armoured fighting vehicle
- IAI – Israel Aircraft Industries
- IAL – Infrared Aiming Light
- IASD – Instant Ammunition Selection Device
- IBAS – Improved Bradley Acquisition System
- ICBM – Intercontinental ballistic missile
- ICC – information co-ordination centre
- ICM – Improved Conventional Munition
- ICM – BB improved conventional munition base bleed
- ICV – Infantry Combat Vehicle
- IDF – Israel Defense Forces
- IDF – Indirect fire
- IDW – Individual Defence Weapon
- IED – Improvised Explosive Device
- IEPG – Independent European Program Group
- IFCS – Improved/Integrated Fire-Control System
- IFF – Identification Friend or Foe
- IFV – infantry fighting vehicle
- IFVwCM – Infantry Fighting Vehicle with Integrated Countermeasures (US)
- IGLS – Individual Grenade Launcher System
- II – image intensification/intensifier
- IIR – Imaging Infra-Red
- ILL – illuminating
- ILMS – Improved Launcher Mechanical System
- ILS – Integrated Logistic Support
- IM – Insensitive Munition(s)
- IMMLC – Improved Medium Mobility Load Carrier
- IMSC – International Maritime Security Construct
- IMU – Inertial Measurement Unit
- INSAS – Indian Small Arms System
- InSb – Indium-antimonide
- INS -Indian Naval ship
- IOC – initial operational capability
- IOF – Indian Ordnance Factory
- IPB – Intelligence Preparation of the Battlefield
- IPF – Initial Production Facility
- IPO – International Programme Office
- IPPD – Integrated Product Process Development
- IR – Infra-Red
- IRBM – Intermediate-range ballistic missile
- IRU – Inertial Reference Unit
- IS – internal security
- ISD – In Service Date
- ISGU – Integrated Sight and Guidance Unit
- ISR – Intelligence Surveillance and Reconnaissance
- ISU – Integrated Sight Unit
- ISV – Internal Security Vehicle
- ITAS – Improved Target Acquisition System
- ITOW – Improved TOW
- ITPIAL – Infra-red Target Pointer/Illuminator/Aiming Laser
- ITT – Invitation To Tender
- ITV – Improved TOW Vehicle (US)
- IVPDL – Inter-Vehicle Positioning and Data Link (US)
- IWAT Insurgency Weapons And Tactics
- IW – Individual Weapon
- IWS – Improved Weapon System

== J ==
- JASDF – Japan Air Self-Defense Force
- JBMoU – Joint Ballistic Memorandum of Understanding
- JDAM – Joint Direct Attack Munition
- JETDS – Joint Electronics Type Designation System
- JERRV – Joint Engineer Rapid Response Vehicle
- JGSDF – Japan Ground Self-Defense Force
- JHP – Jacketed hollow point
- JLTV – Joint Light Tactical Vehicle
- JMAC – Joint Medium-calibre Automatic Cannon
- JMSDF – Japan Maritime Self-Defense Force
- JOIR – Joint Operations Information Range
- JPO – Joint Project Office
- JSC – Joint Steering Committee
- JSCS – Joint Service Combat Shotgun
- JSDF – Japan Self-Defense Force
- JSOC – Joint Special Operations Command
- JSP – Jacketed Soft Point
- JSSAMP – Joint Services Small Arms Master Plan
- JSSAP – Joint Service Small Arms Program
- JTIDS – Joint Tactical Information Distribution System

== K ==
- KAAV – Korean Armoured Amphibious Vehicle
- KAC – Knight's Armament Company
- KE – Kinetic energy
- KEC – Kaman Electromagnetics Corporation
- KEM – Kinetic Energy Missile (US)
- kg – kilogramme(s)
- KHA – Killed Hostile Action (US Vietnam War)
- KIA – Killed in Action
- KIFV – Korean Infantry Fighting Vehicle
- KNHA – Killed Non-Hostile Action (US Vietnam War)
- KPA – Korean People's Army

== L ==
- LAAG – light anti-aircraft gun
- LAAM – Light Anti-Aircraft Missile
- LCAC – Landing Craft Air Cushion
- LAD – light aid detachment
- LADS – light air defense system (US)
- LAG – Light Artillery Gun
- LALO – Low Altitude Low Opening
- LAM – Laser Aiming Module
- LAP – Load-Assemble-Pack (LAP) munitions production
- LAPES – Low-Altitude Parachute Extraction System
- LAR – Light Automatic Rifle
- LASER – Light Amplification by Stimulated Emission of Radiation
- LASIP – Light Artillery System Improvement Plan
- LATS – Light Armoured Turret System
- LAU – Light Armoured Unit
- LAV – Light Armored Vehicle (US)
- LAV – Light Assault Vehicle (US)
- LAV-AD – Light Armored Vehicle – Air Defense
- LAW – Light Anti-tank Weapon
- LB – Long Barrel
- LC – Laser Collimator
- LCD – Liquid crystal display
- LCS – Loader Control System
- LCU – Landing Craft Utility
- LCV – Light Contingency Vehicle (LCV) (US)
- LD – Low drag, Line of Departure
- LE – Law Enforcement
- LED – light emitting diode
- LEP – Life Extension Programme
- LEU – Launcher Erector Unit
- LF – ATGW Light Forces' Anti-Tank Guided Weapon
- LF – Linked Feed
- LFA – Low Flying Area
- LFHG – Lightweight Fragmentation Hand Grenade
- LFL – Light Fighter Lethality
- LIA – Linear Induction Accelerator
- LIC – Low Intensity Conflict
- LIMAWS – Lightweight Mobile Artillery Weapon System
- LION – Lightweight Infra-red Observation Night sight
- LIW – Lyttleton Engineering Works
- LKP – Loader Keyboard Panel
- LLAD – low-level air defence
- LLLTV – low light level television
- LLM – Launcher Loader Module
- LMAW – Light Multi-purpose Assault Weapon
- LMG – Light Machine Gun
- LNS – Land Navigation System
- LNS – Laying and Navigation System
- L/O – Liaison Officer
- LOAL – Lock-On After Launch
- LOBL – Lock-On Before Launch
- LOC – Line Of Communication
- LOLEX – Low-altitude parachute-extraction system
- LOS – Line Of Sight
- LOSAT – Line Of Sight Anti-Tank
- LOSBR – Line Of Sight Beam Riding
- LP – Liquid Propellant
- LP – Listening Post
- LPC – Launch Pod Container
- LPC – Launcher Pod Carrier
- LPG – Liquid Propellant Gun
- LPO – Leading Petty Officer
- LPT – Low-Profile Turret
- LPTS – Lightweight Protected Turret System
- LR – Long Rifle
- LR – Long-Range
- LRAR – Long Range Artillery Rocket
- LRASS – Long-Range Advanced Scout System
- LRAT – long-range anti-tank
- LRBB – long-range base bleed
- LRD – Long Range Deflagrator
- LRF – laser rangefinder
- LRF – Low Recoil Force
- LRHB – long-range hollow base
- LRIP – Low-Rate Initial Production
- LRM – Laser Rangefinder Module
- LRN – Lead Round Nose
- LRN – Low Recoil NORICUM
- LRRP – Long Range Reconnaissance Patrol
- LRSA – Long Range Sniper Ammunition
- LRSU – Long Range Surveillance Unit
- LRU – Launcher Replenishment Unit
- LRU – Line Replacement Unit
- LRU – Line-Replaceable Unit
- LSAT- Lightweight Small Arms Technologies
- LSB – Landing Support Battalion
- LSO – Landing signal officer
- LSS – Lightweight Shotgun System
- LST – Landing Ship, Tank
- LSVW – Light Support Vehicle, Wheeled (Canada)
- LSW – Light Support Weapon
- LTA – Launch Tube Assembly
- LTD – Laser Target Designator
- LTFCS – Laser Tank Fire-Control System
- LTP – Laser Target Pointer, Luminesant Training Projectile
- LUTE – Lightweight Uncooled Thermal Imager Equipment
- LVA – landing vehicle assault (US)
- LVS – Lightweight Video Sight
- LVT – Landing Vehicle Tracked (US)
- LVTC – Landing Vehicle Tracked Command (US)
- LVTE – Landing Vehicle Tracked Engineer (US)
- LVTH – Landing Vehicle Tracked Howitzer (US)
- LVTP – Landing Vehicle Tracked Personnel (US)
- LVTR – Landing Vehicle Tracked Recovery (US)
- LWC – Lead Wad Cutter
- LWIR – Long Wave Infrared
- LWL – LightWeight Launcher
- LWML – LightWeight Multiple Launcher
- LWMMG – LightWeight Medium Machine Gun
- LWMS – LightWeight Modular Sight
- LWS – laser warning system
- LWT – light weapon turret
- LZ – landing zone
- LRW – Light Repair Works (Indian Army)

== M ==
- m – metre(s)
- m/s – metres per second
- MAB – Marine Amphibious Brigade
- MABS – Marine Air Base Squadron
- MAC – Medium Armored Car (US)
- MAC – Military Airlift Command
- MACS – Modular Artillery Charge System
- MACS – Marine Air Control Squadron
- MADLS – Mobile Air Defence Launching System
- MAF – Marine Amphibious Force
- MAG – Marine Aircraft Group
- MAGTEC – Marine Air/Ground Training & Education Command
- MAGTF – Marine Air/Ground Task Force
- MAHEM – Magnetohydrodynamic Explosive Munition
- MALOS – Miniature Laser Optical Sight
- MALS – Marine Air Logistics Squadron
- MAMBA – Mobile Artillery Monitoring Battlefield Radar
- MANPADS – Man Portable Air Defense System
- MAOV – Mobile Artillery Observation Vehicle
- MAP – Military Aid Programme
- MAPS – Modular Azimuth Position System
- MAR – Micro Assault Rifle
- MARDI – Mobile Advanced Robotics Defence Initiative (UK)
- MARDIV – Marine Division (US)
- MARS – Military Amateur Radio Station
- MARS – Mini Assault Rifle System
- MARS – Multi-purpose Aiming Reflex Sight
- MARS – Multiple Artillery Rocket System
- MASS – Marine Air Support Squadron
- MATCS – Marine Air Traffic Control Squadron
- MATSG – Marine Air Training Support Group
- MAU(SOC) – Marine Amphibious Unit (Special Operations Capable)
- MAV – maintenance assist vehicle
- MAVD – MLRS Aim Verification Device
- MAW – Marine Air Wing (US)
- MBA – main battle area
- MBB – Messerschmitt-Bцlkow-Blohm
- MBC – Mortar Ballistic Computer
- MBF – Multiple-barrel firearm
- MBT – main battle tank
- MCISRE – Marine Corps Intelligence, Surveillance, and Reconnaissance Enterprise
- MCLOS – Manual Command to Line Of Sight
- MCRV – Mechanised Combat Repair Vehicle
- MCS – Microclimate Conditioning System
- MCS – modular charge system
- MCSK – Mine Clearance System Kit (US)
- MCT – Medium Combat Tractor (US)
- MCT – Mercury Cadmium Telluride
- MCV – Mechanised Combat Vehicle
- MCWL – Marine Corps Warfighting Laboratory
- MCWS – Minor Caliber Weapons Station (US)
- MDB – Multi Domain Battle
- MDMP – Military Decision Making Process
- MDU – Map Display Unit
- MEB – Marine Expeditionary Brigade
- MEDEVAC – Medical Evacuation
- MEF – Marine Expeditionary Force
- MENS – Mission Element Need Statement (US)
- MEP – Modular Explosive Penetrator
- MEPS – Military Entrance Processing Station
- METO – Middle East Treaty Organisation; CENTO or Baghdad Pact
- METL – Mission Essential Task List
- METT-TC – Mission, Enemy, Terrain and weather, Troops and support available—Time available, Civilians
- METT-TSL – Mission, Enemy, Terrain and weather, Troops and fire support available – Time available, Space, Logistics
- MEU – Marine Expeditionary Unit
- MEU(SOC) – Marine Expeditionary Unit (Special Operations Capable)
- MEV – medical evacuation vehicle (US)
- MEWS – Mobile Electronic Warfare System
- MEWSS – Mobile Electronic Warfare Support System
- MF – multifunction
- MFC – Mortar Fire Control(ler)
- MFCS – Multi-Fire Control System/Mortar Fore Control System
- MFCV – Missile Fire-Control Vehicle
- MFF – munition filling factory
- MG – machine gun
- MGB – Medium Girder Bridge
- MGL – Multiple Grenade Launcher
- MGS – Mobile Gun System
- MGTS – MultiGun Turret System
- MGU – Mid-course Guidance Unit
- MI – Military Intelligence
- MIA – Missing In Action
- MICOM – Missile Command (US)
- MICV – Mechanised Infantry Combat Vehicle
- MILAN – Missile d'Infantrie Léger Antichar (light infantry anti-tank missile)
- MILDEC – Military deception
- MILES – Multiple Integrated Laser Engagement System (US)
- MILSPEC – Military Specification
- MILSTD – MILitary STANdard
- MILSTAR – MILitary Strategic and Tactical Relay (US)
- MIPS – Medium Integrated Propulsion System (US)
- MIR – Mechanized Infantry Regiment (Sri Lanka)
- MIRV – Multiple independently targetable reentry vehicle
- MLA – Manufacturing Licence Agreement
- MLC – Military Load Class
- MLC – Modular Load Carrier
- MLF – Marine Logistics Force
- MLR – Marine Littoral Regiment
- MLI – Mid-Life Improvement
- MLO – Muzzle Loaded Ordnance
- MLRS – Multiple Launch Rocket System (US)
- mm – millimetre(s)
- MMBF – mean miles between failures
- MMG – Medium Machine Gun
- MMS – mast-mounted sight
- MMS – Modular Mounting System
- MNVD – Monocular night vision device
- MoA – Memorandum of Agreement
- MOA – Minute Of Angle
- MoD – Ministry of defence
- MODA – Ministry of Defence and Aviation
- MOLF – Modular Laser Fire Control (Germany)
- MOLLE – Modular lightweight load-carrying equipment
- MOPP – Mission Oriented Protective Posture (US)
- MOS – Military occupational specialty (US)
- MoU – Memorandum of Understanding
- MOUT – Military Operations in Urban Terrain (urban warfare) (US)
- MP – Machine Pistol
- MP – Military police
- MPBAV – MultiPurpose Base Armoured Vehicle
- MPC – MultiPurpose Carrier (Netherlands)
- MPDS – Missile Piercing Discarding Sabot
- MPGS – Mobile Protected Gun System (US)
- MPI – Mean Point of Impact
- MPIM – MultiPurpose Individual Munition
- MPM – MultiPurpose Munition
- MPS – Maritime Prepositioning Ships (US)
- MPV – Multi-Purpose Vehicle
- MPWS – Mobile Protected Weapon System (US)
- MR – Medium Range
- MRAP – Mine Resistant Ambush Protected (Vehicle)
- MRAR – MultiRole Assault Round
- MRAV – MultiRole Armoured Vehicle
- MRBF – mean rounds before failure
- MRBS – mean rounds between stoppages
- MRE – Meal Ready to Eat
- MRS – multiple rocket system
- MRS – muzzle reference system
- MRSI – Multiple Round Simultaneous Impact
- MRV(R) – Mechanised Recovery Vehicle (Repair)
- MRVR – Mechanised Repair and Recovery Vehicle (US)
- MSSG – MAU/MEU Service Support Group (USMC)
- MSL – Missile
- MSLEX – Missile exercise
- MSR – Missile Simulation Round
- MSR – Main supply route
- MSTAR – Man-portable Surveillance and Target Acquisition Radar
- MSV – Modular Support Vehicle
- MT – mechanical time
- MTB – Mobility TestBed
- MTBF – Mean Time Between Failure
- MTI – moving target indication
- MTL – Materials Technology Laboratory (US)
- MTR – Mobile Test Rig (US)
- MTSQ – mechanical time and super-quick
- MTSQ – Mechanical Time Semi-Quick
- MTU – Motoren- und Turbinen-Union
- MTVL – mobile tactical vehicle light
- MUGS – Multipurpose Universal Gunner Sight
- MULE – Modular Universal Laser Equipment (US)
- MUSS – Multifunctional Selfprotection System
- MV – muzzle velocity
- MVEE – Military Vehicles and Engineering Establishment (UK)
- MVRS – Muzzle Velocity Radar System
- MWCS – Marine Wing Communications Squadron
- MWHS – Marine Wing Headquarters Squadron
- MWS – Manned Weapon Station (US)
- MWS – Modular Weapon System
- MWSG – Marine Wing Support Group
- MWSS – Marine Wing Support Squadron

== N ==
- NAS – Naval Air Station
- NATO – North Atlantic Treaty Organization
- NAVSEA – Naval Sea Systems Command
- NBC – Nuclear, biological, chemical
- NBMR – NATO basic military requirement
- NCIS – Naval Criminal Investigative Service (US)
- NCO – Non-commissioned officer (US, E-4 – E-9)
- NCOIC – Non-Commissioned Officer in Charge
- NDI – Non-developmental item
- NDU – Navigation display unit
- NFOV – Narrow field of view
- NG – New/next generation
- Ni/Cd – Nickel–cadmium
- NLAW – Next lightweight anti-armour weapon
- NLOS-C – Non-line-of-sight cannon
- NLOS-M – Non-line-of-sight mortar
- NOD(s) – Night observation device(s)
- NOE – Nap-of-the-earth
- NOTAM – Notice to airmen
- NPAWS - Neutral particle weapon system
- NRF – NATO Response Force
- NS – Network services
- NTC – National Training Center (USA)
- NUGP – nominal unit ground pressure
- NV – Night Vision
- NVD – Night vision device
- NVE – Night vision equipment
- NVESD – Night Vision and Electronic Sensors Directorate
- NVG – Night vision goggle
- NVS – Night vision system
- NZDF – New Zealand Defence Force
- NZEF – New Zealand Expeditionary Force (in WWI & WWII)
- NZSAS – New Zealand Special Air Service

== O ==
- OBR – Optical Beam-Riding
- OCC – Obus à Charge Creusé (shaped-charge shell)
- OCOKA – Observation and fields of fire, Cover and concealment, Obstacles, Key terrain, and Avenues of Approach.
- OCSW – Objective Crew-Served Weapon
- OCU – Operational Centre Unit
- ODE – Ordnance Development and Engineering (Singapore)
- OEG – Occluded Eye Gunsight (a type of Collimator sight)
- OEO – optical and electro-optical
- OFSA – Objective Family of Small Arms
- OFSA – One Size Fits All
- OFW – Objective Force Warrior
- OHWS – Offensive Hand Weapon System
- OIC – Officer In Charge
- OICW – Objective Individual Combat Weapon
- OLF – Operational Low Flying
- OOTW – Operations Other Than War
- OP – Observation post
- OP – Operators Panel
- OPCON – OPerational CONtrol
- OPDW – Objective Personal Defense Weapon
- OPFOR – OPposing FORces
- OPORD – OPerations Order
- OPSEC – OPerational SECurity
- OPV – Observation Post Vehicle
- OSW – Objective Sniper Weapon
- OSC – Operation Strategy Command
- OSS (USAF) – Operational Support Squadron
- OSW (USAF) – Operational Support, Weather
- OT – operational test
- OTA – overflight top attack
- OTEA – Operational Test and Evaluation Agency (US)

== P ==
- P – How pack howitzer
- P-38 — P-38 can opener (US)
- P3I – Pre-Planned Product Improvements
- PACESDO – Protection, Ammunition, Casualties, Equipment/Enemy, Dig-in/Deploy, Orders
- PAR – pulse acquisition radar
- PARA – Parachute Regiment
- PARAMIL – Paramilitary
- PAT – power-assisted traverse
- PAWPERSO – Protection, Ammunition, Weapon, Personal Equipment, Radio, Specialist Equipment, Orders
- PC – Personal Computer
- PCB – printed circuit board
- PCC – Police Compact Carbine
- PCI – Pre-combat inspection
- PD – Point Defense
- PD – point detonating
- PD – Point of Departure
- PDNA – Positioning Determining/Navigation Unit
- PDRR – Program Definition and Risk Reduction
- PDW – Personal Defence Weapon
- PE – MoD Procurement Executive (UK)
- PE – Peace Enforcement (US DoD)
- PEC – Printed Electronic Circuits
- PENAID – Penetration aid
- PFD – proximity fuze disconnector
- PFHE – prefragmented high-explosive
- PLF – protective line of fire
- PFPX – prefragmented proximity fuzed
- PGMM – Precision Guided Mortar Munition
- PH – Probability of Hit
- Pi – Probability of incapacitation
- PIAT – Projector, Infantry, Anti Tank
- PIBD – Point Initiating Base Detonated
- PID – Positive Identification
- PIE – pyrotechnically initiated explosive
- PIP – Product Improvement Programme
- PL – Phase Line
- PLA – People's Liberation Army
- PLAAF – People's Liberation Army Air Force
- PLAGF – People's Liberation Army Ground Force
- PLAN – People's Liberation Army Navy
- PLANAF – People's Liberation Army Naval Air Force
- PLANMC – People's Liberation Army Navy Marine Corps
- PLARF – People's Liberation Army Rocket Force
- PLARS – Position Location And Reporting System (US)
- PLASSF – People's Liberation Army Strategic Support Force
- PLC – Programmable Logic Control
- PLOS – Predicted Line Of Sight
- PLS – Palletized Load System (US)
- PM – porte mortier (mortar carrier)
- PM – Product Manager
- PMCS – Preventative Maintenance Checks and Services
- PMEE – Prime Mission Electronic Equipment (USAF)
- PMO – Program Management Office (US)
- PMO – Provost Marshall's Office
- PMOD – Platform Modifications
- PMS – Pedestal-Mounted Stinger
- PNU – Position Navigation Unit
- PM WIN-T – Project Manager Warfighter Information Network-Tactical
- POA&M – Plan Of Action & Milestones
- POF – Pakistan Ordnance Factory
- POG – Person other than Grunt
- POS – Postes Optiques de Surveillance
- POW – Prisoner of War
- PPG – PT Parade Games (Bangladesh Cadet Colleges)
- PPI – plan position indicator
- PPS – Precise Positioning Service
- PPV – Protected Patrol Vehicle
- PRAC – practice
- PRAC-T – practice tracer
- PRESAR – Preparation, React to enemy fire, Establish enemy position, Suppress the enemy, Assault, Reorg
- PRI – projector reticle image
- PRP – Personnel Reliability Program (screening and monitoring of individuals with access to "special" weapons)
- PSBC – Platoon Sergeant's Battle Course
- PSD – Propulsion System Demonstrator
- PSO – Peace Support Operations
- PSS – Primary Sight System
- PTI – Physical Training Instructor
- PTO – power take-off
- PVP – Petit Véhicule Protégé
- PW – Prisoner of War
- PWI-SR(GR) – Panser Wagen Infanterie-Standaard (Groep)
- PWP – Plasticised White Phosphorus
- PWR – Power

== Q ==
- QCB – Quick Change Barrel
- QE – Quadrant Elevation
- QRF – Quick Reaction Force
- QTOL – Quiet Take Off And Landing

== R ==
- RA – Royal Artillery
- RAA – Royal Australian Artillery
- RAAM – Rifle-launched Anti-Armour Munition
- RAAMS – Remote Anti-Armor Mine System (US)
- PABD – Pay Entry Base Date
- RAC – Royal Armoured Corps
- RADIRS – Rapid Deployment Multiple Rocket System (US)
- RAAF – Royal Australian Air Force
- RAE – Royal Aircraft Establishment, Royal Aircraft Establishment (Farnborough)
- RAE – Royal Australian Engineers, Australian Combat Engineers
- RAF – Royal Air Force
- RAM-D – reliability, availability, maintainability and durability
- RAN – Royal Australian Navy
- RAO – Rear Area Operations
- RAP – Regimental Aid Post
- RAP – rocket-assisted projectile
- RAPI – Reactive Armour Protection
- RARDE – Royal Armament Research and Development Establishment (UK)
- RATAC – Radar de Tir pour L'Artillerie de Campagne (radar for field artillery fire)
- RATELO – Radio Telephone Operator
- RAW – Rifleman's Assault Weapon
- RBL – Range and Bearing Launch
- RBOC – Rapid Bloom Offboard Chaff
- RC/MAS – Reserve Component/Modified Armament System
- RCAAS – Remote-Controlled Anti-Armor System (US)
- RCAF – Royal Canadian Air Force
- RCC – ROLAND Coordination Center (US)
- RCWS – Remote-Controlled Weapon Station
- RCL – Recoilless rifle
- RCN – Royal Canadian Navy
- RCS – Radar Cross Section
- RCT – Regimental Combat Team
- RCT – Royal Corps of Transport
- RCV – Robotic Command Vehicle
- RDF – Rapid Deployment Forces
- RDF/LT – Rapid Deployment Force Light Tank (US)
- RDJTF – Rapid Deployment Joint Task Force (US)
- RDT&E – Research Development Test and Evaluation
- REME – Royal Electrical and Mechanical Engineers
- REMF – Rear Echelon Mother Fucker
- REMSEC – Remanence Security
- RF – Rimfire
- RFA – Royal Field Artillery or Royal Fleet Auxiliary
- RFAS – Russian Federation and Associated States
- RFC – Royal Flying Corps
- RFI – request for information
- RFP – request for proposals
- RFPI – Rapid Force Projection Initiative
- RFQ – Request For Quotations
- RGGS – Rifle Grenade General Service
- RHA – rolled homogeneous armour
- RHA – Royal Horse Artillery
- RIN – the former Royal Indian Navy
- RIO – Radar Intercept Officer
- RIS – Rail Interface System
- RISE – Reliability Improved Selected Equipment
- RISTA – Reconnaissance, Intelligence, Surveillance and Target Acquisition
- RLC – Royal Logistic Corps
- RLEM – Rifle-Launched Entry Munition
- RLG – Ring Laser Gyro
- RLT – Regimental Landing Team
- RMF – Risk Management Framework
- RMG – ranging machine gun
- RN – Royal Navy
- RNZAF – Royal New Zealand Air Force
- RNZN – Royal New Zealand Navy
- RO – Royal Ordnance
- ROBAT – Robotic Counter-Obstacle Vehicle (US)
- RoC – Republic of China
- ROC – required operational characteristics
- ROE – Rules Of Engagement
- ROF – Royal Ordnance Factory (UK)
- ROF – Rate of fire
- RoK – Republic of Korea
- RoKMC – Republic of Korea Marine Corps
- RoKIT – Republic of Korea Indigenous Tank
- ROR – range only radar
- ROTA – Royal Ordnance Training Ammunition
- RP – Red phosphorus
- RP – rocket-propelled
- RP – Regimental police
- RPC – Rocket Pod Container
- RPG – Rocket-propelled grenade
- RPG – Ruchnoy Protivotankovy Granatomyot
- RPV – Remotely piloted vehicle
- RR – Recoilless rifle
- RRPR – Reduced Range Practice Rocket
- RRT – Radio Recon Team
- RRTR – Reduced Range Training Round
- RSAF – Royal Small Arms Factory (UK) (now closed)
- RSN – Role Specialist Nation (US & NATO)
- RSS – Rosette Scanning Seeker
- RTE – Rifle Team Equipment
- RTO – Radio/Telephone Operator
- RTOL – Reduced Take Off and Landing
- RTT – Roues Transporteur de Troupes
- RUC – Royal Ulster Constabulary
- RUF – Rules on the Use of Force
- RV – Rendezvous/Rendezvous point
- RWS – Remote weapon system (or station)
- RWR – Radar Warning Receiver

== S ==
- s – second(s)
- S&W – Smith & Wesson
- SA – Situation Awareness
- SABCA – Société Anonyme Belge de Constructions Aéronautiques
- SABR – Selectable Assault Battle Rifle
- SABS – Stabilizing Automatic Bomb Sight
- SAC – Small Arms Collimator
- SACLOS – Semi-Automatic Command to Line Of Sight
- SADA – Standard Advanced Dewar Assembly
- SADARM – Sense And Destroy Armor (US)
- SADF – South African Defence Force
- SADM – Special Atomic Demolition Munition
- SAE – Society of Automotive Engineers
- SAF – Small Arms Fire
- SAFCS – Small Arms Fire Control System
- SAFIRE – Surface-to-Air Fire
- SAL – semi-active laser
- SAL – Search-and-locate
- SAM – surface-to-air missile
- SAMM – Société d'Applications des Machines Motrices
- SANDF – South African National Defence Force
- SANG – Saudi Arabian National Guard
- SAP – Semi-Armour-Piercing
- SAPHEI – Semi-Armour-Piercing High Explosive Incendiary
- SAPI – Semi Armour-Piercing Incendiary
  - SAPI – Small Arms Protective Insert
- SAR – Search and Rescue
- SAS – Special Air Service
- SASR – Special Air Service Regiment
- SAS-EAS – Sealed Authenticator System – Emergency Action Procedures (Nuclear Weapons Release Control)
- SASR – Special Application Sniper Rifle
- SAT – Small Arms Trainer
- SATCP – Système Anti-aérien à Très Courte Portée (very short-range anti-aircraft system, in French)
- SAVA – Standard Army Vectronics Architecture
- SAW – Squad Automatic Weapon
- SAWS – Squad Automatic Weapon System
- SB – Short Barrel
- SCA - Security Control Assessor
- SCAR – Security Control Asssessor Representative
- SCORE – Stratified Charge Omnivorous Rotary Engine
- SCC – Sea Cadet Corps
- SCI – Sensitive compartmented information
- SD – self-destruct(ion)
- SEAD – Suppression of Enemy Air Defenses
- SEAL – Sea/Air/Land
- SEALOCK – Search, Locate, and Communicate or Kill
- SEATO – Southeast Asia Treaty Organisation
- SECFOR – Security forces
- SECGUARD – Security guard
- SEME – School of Electrical and Mechanical Engineering
- SEN – Shell Extended Range NORICUM
- SEP – Soldier Enhancement Programme
- SF – Special Forces (US/UK)
- SFCS – Simplified Fire-Control System
- SFIM – Société de Fabrication d'Instrument de Mesure
- SFIRR – Solid Fuel Integral (Rocket/Ramjet)
- SFM – Sensor Fuzed Munitions
- SFMG – Sustained Fire Machine Gun
- SFSW – Special Forces Support Weapon
- SFW – Special Forces Weapon
- SGTS – Second-Generation Tank Sight
- SHAPE – Supreme Headquarters Allied Powers Europe
- SH/PRAC – Squash head practice
- SHORAD – Short-Range Air Defence System
- shp – shaft horsepower
- SIC – Second in Command
- SICPS – Standard Integrated Command Post Systems
- SINCGARS – Single Channel Ground/Air Radio System
- SIP – System Improvement Plan/Programme
- SIPS – Small Integrated Propulsion System
- SITREP – Situation Report
- SJFN – Semi-Jacketed Flat Nose
- SJHP – Semi-Jacketed Hollow Point
- SKOT – Sredni Kolowy Opancerzny Transporter (armoured personnel carrier, in Polish)
- SLA – Sri Lanka Army
- SLAC – Sri Lanka Armoured Corps
- SLAF – Sri Lanka Air Force
- SLAGSE – Sri Lanka Army General Service Corps
- SLAOC – Sri Lanka Army Ordnance Corps
- SLAP – saboted light armor penetrator
- SLAPC – Sri Lanka Army Pioneer Corps
- SLASC – Sri Lanka Army Service Corps
- SLAW – Shoulder-Launched Assault Weapon
- SLAWC – Sri Lanka Army Women's Corps
- SLCG – Sri Lanka Coast Guard
- SLCMP – Sri Lanka Corps of Military Police
- SLE – Sri Lanka Engineers
- SLEME – Sri Lanka Electrical and Mechanical Engineers
- SLEP – Service Life Extension Program (US)
- SLLI – Sri Lanka Light Infantry
- SLMC – Sri Lanka Army Medical Corps
- SLNG – Sri Lanka National Guard
- SLN – Sri Lanka Navy
- SLR – Self-Loading Rifle
- SLRC – Sri Lanka Rifle Corps
- SLSR – Sri Lanka Sinha Regiment
- SLWAGL – Super Light Weight Automatic Grenade Launcher
- SM – Smoke
- SMAW – Shoulder-launched Multi-purpose Assault Weapon
- SMG – sub-machine gun
- SMK – Smoke
- SMP – Surface Mine Plough
- SMU – Special Mission Unit
- SNAFU – Situation Normal, All Fouled Up
- SNCO – Staff Non-Commissioned Officer (USMC, E-6 – E-9)
- SNCOIC – Staff Non-Commissioned Officer In Charge (USMC)
- SOCOM – Special Operations Command
- SOF – Special Operations Forces
- SOG – Speed Over Ground
- SOP – Standing/Standard Operating Procedure(s)
- SOS – Struck Off Strength
- SOZ – Sestroretskii Oruzheinyi Zavod (Sestroretsk Arms Factory, in Russian)
  - SOZ – Special Operations Zone
  - SOZ – Strategic Operations Zone
- SP – Shore Patrol
  - SP – Self-propelled
  - SP – Soft Point
- SPAAG – Self-propelled anti-aircraft gun
- SPAAM – Self-propelled anti-aircraft missile
- SPAG – Self-propelled assault gun
- SPARK – Solid propellant advanced (rocket/ramjet) kinetic energy missile
- SPAS – Special Purpose Automatic Shotgun, like SPAS-12 or SPAS-15
- SPATG – Self-propelled anti-tank gun
- SPAW – self-propelled artillery weapon
- SPEAR – Small Precision Enhanced Aiming Rangefinder
- SPG – self-propelled gun
- SPH – self-propelled howitzer
- SPIE – Special Patrol Insertion/Extraction
- SPL – Self-propelled launcher
- SPLL – Self-propelled Loader Launcher
- SPLY – Supply
- SPM – self-propelled mortar
- SPP – Special Purpose Pistol
- SPR – Special Purpose Rifle
- SPS – Standard Positioning Service
- SPSM – Sensorgezundete Panzerabwehr SubMunition
- SPW – Special Purpose Weapon
- SR – Short Rifle
  - SR – Sniper Rifle
  - SR – Staff Requirement
  - SR – Special Reconnaissance
- SRR – Special Reconnaissance Regiment
- SRAW – Short Range Assault Weapon
- SRC – Space Research Corporation
- SRG – Shell replenishment gear
- SRI – Short Range Insert
- SRTS – Short Range Thermal Sight
- SRU – Shop Replaceable Unit
- SRU – Slip Ring Unit
- SRV – Surrogate Research Vehicle (US)
- SS – Submarine
- SSA – Special Spaced Armour
- SSE – Sensitive Site Exploitation
- SSG – Single Shot Gun
- SSK – Single Shot Kill
- SSR – Sniper Support Rifle
  - SSR – Special Support and Reconnaissance Company (DNK)
- SSW – Squad Support Weapon
- ST6 – Seal Team Six
- ST – Staff Target
- STA – shell transfer arm
- STAB – Steered Agile Beams
- STAFF – Small Target Activated Fire-and-Forget (US)
- STANAG – STANdardisation Agreement
- STARTLE – Surveillance and Target Acquisition Radar for Tank Location and Engagement (US)
- STE/ICE – Simplified Test Equipment/Internal Combustion Engine (US)
- STF – Special Task Force
- STORM – Small Tactical Optical Rifle-Mounted
- STOVL – Short Take Off and Vertical Landing
- STUP – Spinning tubular projectile
- SUB – SUBstitute
- SUC – Square Ultra Compact
- SUIT – Sight Unit Infantry Trilux
- SUSAT – Sight Unit Small Arms Trilux
- SWARM – Stabilised Weapon and Reconnaissance Mount
- SWAT – Special Weapons And Tactics
- SWC – Semi WadCutter
- SWS – Sniper Weapon System

== T ==
- T – Tracer
- TAAR – Tactical Air to Air Refueling
- TACBE – Tactical beacon
- TACMS – Army Tactical Missile System (US)
- TACOM – Tank-automotive and Armaments Command (US)
- TACP – Tactical Air Control Party
- TAD – Temporary Additional Duty (Naval Services term) Temporary Duty
- TADDS – Target Alert Display Data Set (US)
- TADS – Target Acquisition and Designation System (US)
- TAM – Tanque Argentino Mediano
- TAS – Target Acquisition Subsystem
- TAS – tracking adjunct system
- TAS – Turret Attitude Sensor
- TBAT – TOW/Bushmaster Armored Turret (US)
- TC – Tank Commander, also Truck Commander (US Army)
- TCO – Tactical Combat Operations
- TCTO – Time-Compliance Technical Order
- TCU – tactical control unit
- TD – Tank Destroyer
- TDCS – Tank Driver Command System
- TDD – Target Detection Device
- TDR – Target Data Receiver
- TDY – Temporary Duty
- TE – Tangent Elevation
- TEL – Transporter-Erector-Launcher
- TELAR – Transporter-Erector-Launcher And Radar
- TES – Tactical Environment Simulation
- TES – target engagement system
- TESS – Telescopic Sighting System
- TGMTS – Tank Gunnery Missile Tracking System
- TGP – Terminally Guided Projectile
- TGP – Targeting pod
- TGS – Tank Gun Sight
- TGSM – terminally guided submunition
- TGTS – tank gunnery training simulator
- TI – thermal imaging/imager
- TIC – Troops In Contact
- TICM – thermal imaging common modules
- TID – Tactical Information Display
- TIIPS – Thermal Imaging and Integrated Position System
- TIM – Thermal Imaging Module
- TIPU – Thermal Image Processing Units
- TIRE – Tank Infra-Red Elbow
- TIS – thermal imaging system
- TISEO – Target Identification System Electro-Optical
- TLC – Transport Launching Container
- TLD – Top Level Demonstrations
- TLE – Treaty Limited Equipment
- TLP – Troop Leading Procedures (US)
- TLR – Tank Laser Rangefinder
- TLS – Tank Laser Sight
- TM&LS – Textron Marine & Land Systems
- TMBC – Turret Management Ballistic Computer
- TMP – Tactical Machine Pistol
- TMS – Turret Modernisation System
- TMUAS – Turreted Mortar Under Armor System (US)
- TNI – Tentara Nasional Indonesia
- TNT – Trinitrotoluene
- TO – Technical Order
- TOE – Table of organisation and equipment
- TOGS – Thermal Observation and Gunnery System (UK)
- TOP – Total Obscuring Power
- TOPAS – Transporter Obrneny Pasovy
- TOTE – Tracker, Optical Thermally Enhanced
- TOW – Tube-launched, Optically-tracked, Wire-guided (US)
- TP – Target Practice
- TP-FL – target practice flash
- TP-S – or TPS Target Practice-Spotting/Signature
- TP-SM – target practice – smoke
- TP-SP – target practice – spotting
- TP-T – target practice – tracer
- TPCM – Target Practice Colour-Marking
- TPDS – Target Practice Discarding Sabot
- TPFSDS-T – target practice fin-stabilised discarding sabot – tracer
- TPTF – Target Practice Time Fuzed
- TR – Triple Rail
- TRACER – Tactical Reconnaissance Armoured Combat Equipment Requirement (UK)
- TRACKSTAR – Tracked Search and Target Acquisition Radar System (US)
- TRADOC – Training and Doctrine Command (US)
- TSFCS – Tank Simplified Fire-Control System
- TSQ – time and super-quick
- TSR – Tavor Sporting Rifle
- TT – transport de troupes (troop transporter)
- TTA – Tactical Training Area
- TTB – Tank TestBed (US)
- TTD – Transformation Technology Demonstrator
- TTG – Time To Go
- TTS – Tank Thermal Sight
- TU – Terminal Unit
- TU – Traversing Unit
- TUA – TOW Under Armor (US)
- TUR – Tiefflieger-Ьberwachungs-Radar (low-level surveillance radar)
- TV – Television
- TWD – Thermal Warning Device
- TWMP – Track Width Mine Plough
- TWS – Thermal Weapon Sight
- TYDP – Ten Year Defence Programme (Australia)

== U ==
- UAV – Unmanned Aerial Vehicle
- UBLE – Universal Bridge Launching Equipment
- UCVP – Universal Combat Vehicle Platform
- UDR – Ulster Defence Regiment
- UET – Universal Engineer Tractor (US)
- UGV – Unmanned Ground Vehicle
- ULC – Unit Load Container
- UMA – Universal Mounting Adapter
- UMP – Universal Machine Pistol
- USA – United States of America/United States Army
- USAADS – U.S. Army Air Defense School
- USAARMS – U.S. Army Armor School
- USAAVNS – U.S. Army Aviation School
- USAAF – United States Army Air Forces
- USAF – United States Air Force
- USCG – United States Coast Guard
- USMC – United States Marine Corps
- USN – United States Navy
- USP – Universal Self-loading Pistol
- UTL – Universal Tactical Light
- UTM – Universal Transverse Mercator
- UTS – Universal Turret System
- UV – Ultraviolet
- UW – Urban warfare

== V ==
- V – Volt(s)
- VAB – Véhicule de l'Avant Blindé (front armoured car)
- VAB – Vickers Armoured Bridgelayer
- VADS – Vulcan Air Defense System (US)
- VAE – Vehiculo Armado Exploracion
- VAK – Vehicle Adaptor Kit
- VAPE – Vehiculo Apoyo y Exploracion
- VARRV – Vickers Armoured Repair and Recovery Vehicle
- VARV – Vickers Armoured Recovery Vehicle
- VBC – Véhicule Blindé de Combat (armoured combat vehicle)
- VBCI – Véhicule Blindé de Combat d'Infanterie
- VBIED – Vehicle-Borne Improvised Explosive Device
- VBL – Véhicule Blindé Léger (light armoured vehicle)
- VBM – Véhicules Blindés Modulaires
- VBSS – Visit Board Search Seizure
- VC – Vehicle Commander
- VCA – Véhicule Chenillé d'Accompagnement (tracked support vehicle)
- VCC – Veicolo Corazzato de Combattimento
- VCG – Véhicule de Combat du Genie (armoured engineer vehicle)
- VCI – Véhicule de Combat d'Infanterie; Vehiculo combate infanteria (infantry combat vehicle)
- VCP – Vehicle Check Point
- VCR – variable compression ratio
- VCR – Véhicule de Combat à Roues (wheeled combat vehicle)
- VCR/AT – Véhicule de Combat à Roues/Atelier Technique (salvage)
- VCR/IS – Véhicule de Combat à Roues/Intervention Sanitaire (stretchers)
- VCR/PC – Véhicule de Combat à Roues/Poste de Commandement (HQ)
- VCR/TH – Véhicule de Combat à Roues/Tourelle HOT (turret with four HOT ATGW)
- VCR/TT – Véhicule de Combat à Roues/Transport de Troupes (troop carrier)
- VCTIS – Vehicle Command and Tactical Information System
- VCTM – Vehiculo de Combate Transporte de Mortero (armoured mortar carrier)
- VCTP – Vehiculo de Combate Transporte de Personal (armoured personnel carrier)
- VDA – Véhicule de Défense Anti-aérienne (anti-aircraft defence vehicle)
- VDAA – Véhicule d'Auto-Défense Anti-aérienne
- VDC – Voltage Direct Current
- VDM – viscous damped mount
- VDSL – Vickers Defence Systems Ltd
- VDU – visual display unit
- VEC – Vehiculo de Exploraciòn de Caballerie
- VEDES – Vehicle Exhaust Dust Ejection System (US)
- VERDI – Vehicle Electronics Research Defence Initiative (UK)
- VHIS – visual hit indicator system
- VIB – Véhicule d'Intervention du Base
- VIDS – Vehicle Integrated Defence System
- VINACS – Vehicle Integrated Navigation and Command System
- VIRSS – Visual and InfraRed Smoke Screening System
- VITS – Video Image Tracking Systems
- VLAP – Velocity-enhanced Long-range Artillery Projectile
- VLC – Véhicule Léger de Combat (light armoured car)
- VLI – Visible Light Illuminator
- VLSMS – Vehicle-Launched Scatterable Mine System
- VMA – Marine Light Attack Squadron
- VMA(AW) – Marine All-Weather Attack Squadron
- VMBT – Vickers Main Battle Tank
- VMF – Marine Fighter Squadron
- VMFA – Marine Fighter Attack Squadron
- VMFA(AW) – Marine All-Weather Fighter Attack Squadron
- VMGR – Marine Aerial Refueler/Transport Squadron
- VMFP – Marine Aerial Reconnaissance Squadron
- VMM – Marine Tilt-rotor (MV-22B) Squadron
- VMU – Marine Unmanned Aerial Vehicle Squadron
- VMR – Marine Transport Squadron
- VMAQ – Marine Electronic Warfare Attack Squadron
- VMS – Vehicle Motion Sensor
- VNAS – Vehicle Navigation Air System
- VRL – Véhicule Reconnaissance Léger (light reconnaissance vehicle)
- VSEL – Vickers Shipbuilding and Engineering Ltd
- VT – variable time (fuse)
- VTOL – Vertical Take-Off and Landing aircraft
- VTP – véhicule transport de personnel (personnel carrier)
- VTT – véhicule transport de troupe (troop transporter)
- VVSS – vertical volute spring suspension
- VXB – Véhicule Blindé à Vocations Multiples (multipurpose armoured car)

== W ==
- WAAC – Women's Auxiliary Army Corps and individual members of; obsolete
- WAC – Women's Army Corps and individual members of; obsolete
- WAF – Women (in the) Air Force and individual members of; obsolete
- WAM – Wide Area Mines (US)
- WAMI – Wide Area Motion Imagery (US)
- WAPC – Wheeled Armoured Personnel Carrier (Canada)
- WASAD – Wide Angle Surveillance and Automatic Detection Device
- WAV – Wide Angle Viewing
- WAVES – Women Accepted for Volunteer Emergency Service (USN); obsolete
- WES – Wing Engineer Squadron (USMC)
- WFOV – Wide Field of View
- WFSV – Wheeled Fire Support Vehicle (Canada)
- WHA – Wounded Hostile Action (US Vietnam War)
- WHA – Weapons Head Assembly
- WHSA – Weapons Head Support Assembly
- WLR – Weapon Locating Radar
- WM – Woman/Women Marine(s)
- WMD – Weapon(s) of Mass Destruction
- WMRV – Wheeled Maintenance and Recovery Vehicle (Canada)
- WNHA – Wounded Non-Hostile Action (US Vietnam War)
- WP – white phosphorus
- WP-T – white phosphorus – tracer
- WSM – Winchester Short Magnum
- WTS – Wing Transportation Squadron (USMC)

== X ==
- XO – Executive Officer

== Y ==
- YMRS – Yugoslav multiple rocket system

== Z ==
- ZULU – Zulu time (timezone equivalent to UTC)

== See also ==
- List of established military terms
- List of military tactics
- Glossary of firearms terminology
- List of aviation, avionics, aerospace and aeronautical abbreviations
- Military Abbreviations www.marx-mil.com by Stefan Marx
