= AMN =

Amn or AMN may refer to:

== Biology ==
- Alpha motor neuron (α-MNs), large lower motor neurons of the brainstem and spinal cord
- Amnionless, a gene for a protein necessary for efficient absorption of vitamin B12
- Adrenoleukodystrophy, a rare X-linked genetic disease

== Media companies ==
- AMN (TV station), in Griffith, New South Wales, Australia
- Access Media Network, a communications media company
- Al-Masdar News, a multilingual news website
- All Media Network, a former music, movie and game database company acquired by RhythmOne

== Military and politics ==
- Afghanistan Mission Network, a coalition network for NATO led missions in Afghanistan
- Airman, a low-grade enlisted rank in the US armed forces
- Directorate of General Security, Arabic name of former Iraqi intelligence agency
- Alianţa Moldova Noastră, a former social-liberal political party in Moldova

== Other uses ==
- Amn (Forgotten Realms), a fictional country in Dungeons & Dragons
- Ahli Mangku Negara, a Malaysian honour
- Ainsley Maitland-Niles, a professional footballer
- Gratiot Community Airport, Alma, Michigan, US (IATA code AMN)
