= Field order =

Field order may refer to:

- A type of playback for interlaced video
- A way of presenting information about a military situation in the field, as in the five paragraph field order
- The order (size) of a finite field
