= Special Task Force =

Special Task Force may refer to:

- Special Task Force (India)
- Special Task Force (SAPS), South Africa
- Special Task Force (Sri Lanka)
- Special Task Force of National Anti-Drug Department – Slovakia
- Special Task Force On Organised Crime, Malaysia
- TRNC Special Task Force Command, Northern Cyprus
- SEK (Germany) (Spezialeinsatzkommando), Germany

== See also ==
- STF (disambiguation)
