= Engineering Installation =

Engineering and Installation, better known as E&I, is a functionary of the United States Air Force that provides the engineering and installation of telecommunications into permanent facilities. This includes removal and relocation of old or outdated ground communication-electronics systems, and to provide for emergency and programmed, mobile, on-site, maintenance and modification of these systems.

Engineering and Installation Missions deploy worldwide to engineer, install, remove, and relocate Command, Control, Communications, Computers, and Intelligence (C4I) information systems and infrastructure such as antennas, cabling, radios, navigational aids, and meteorological equipment. E&I can be described as a corps of telecommunication engineers and the functional intermediary between civil engineers and information technology professionals. Engineering and Installation Squadrons fall under the Major Command of the Air Force Space Command.

There are currently 1 active duty E&I unit, 15 Air National Guard E&I squadrons, and 1 E&I team assigned to a combat support agency.
