= Federated Mission Networking =

NATO initiative

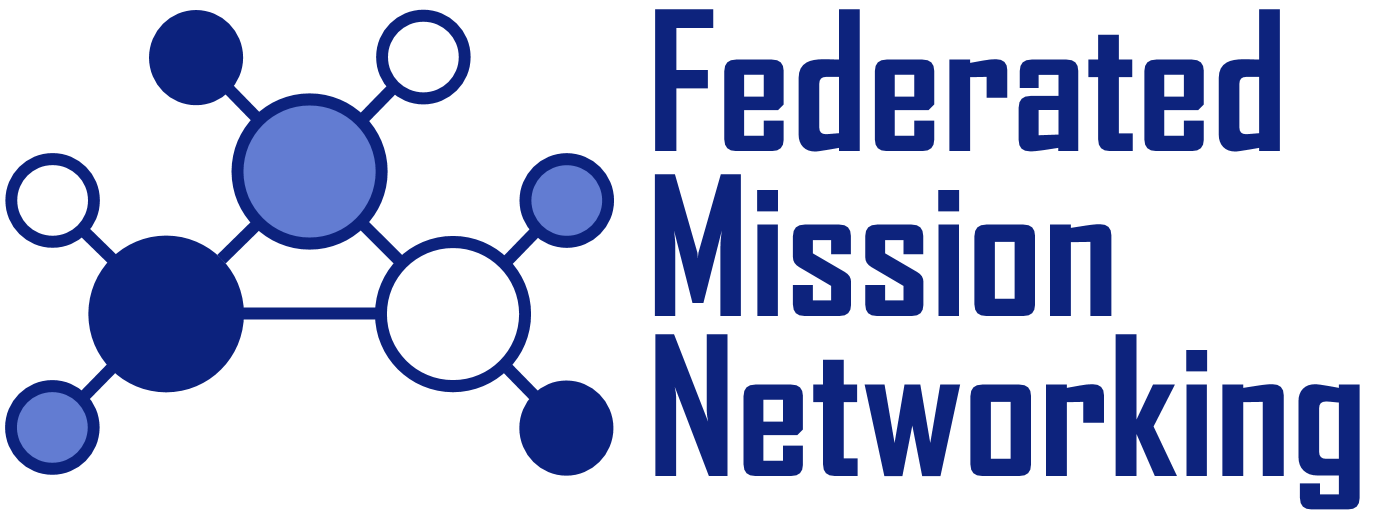
- Formation: 2015
- Type: Intergovernmental organization
- Purpose: Enabling better command and control, decision making and information sharing by connecting forces in a coalition environment
- Location: Mons, Belgium
- Products: FMN Spiral Specifications; Joining, Membership and Exit Instructions (JMEIs)
- Fields: Standardization
- Members: 43 (32 NATO Nations, 11 non-NATO nations, and NATO Command Structure)
- Owner: NATO
- Board of directors: FMN Management Group
- Main organ: FMN Secretariat
- Parent organization: NATO Military Committee
- Website: www.act.nato.int/activities/federated-mission-networking/ coi.nato.int/FMNPublic/SitePages/Home.aspx; FMN on LinkedIn

Federated Mission Networking (FMN) is an initiative to ensure the interoperability and operational effectiveness of the North Atlantic Treaty Organization (NATO). As a central component of the Connected Forces Initiative, FMN supports improved communication, training, and joint operations among Allied and Partner forces. This includes the NATO Command Structure as well as the NATO Force Structure. The purpose of FMN is ultimately to support Command, Control, Communications, Computers, Intelligence, Surveillance and Reconnaissance (C4ISR) and decision-making in operations by enabling the rapid creation of mission networks.

Including the NATO Command Structure, 43 nations have joined the FMN initiative as so-called "FMN Affiliates" and work together under the FMN Framework Process to coordinate the design, development, and delivery of operational and technical capabilities required to conduct net-centric operations. Each development increment is referred to as an "FMN Spiral." The respective requirements, architecture, standards, procedures, and technical instructions are documented in the so-called "FMN Spiral Specifications". FMN Spiral Specifications are based on well-known standards and best practices, and should be or are supported by most off-the-shelf products and vendor neutral. Standards and profiles specify a common, technology and topology independent network interoperability layer (or federated core) for federated mission networks. There is also a rolling 10-year FMN Spiral Specification Roadmap of envisioned future capabilities. At the same time, the Coalition Interoperability Assurance and Validation (CIAV) process ensures that current interoperability issues are being identified and fed back into FMN capability development.

== Background ==
NATO Federated Mission Networking arose from the operational requirements during the War in Afghanistan (2001–2021), where troop-contributing nations operated in a single information-sharing domain called the Afghanistan Mission Network (AMN). With the experience of the ISAF in Afghanistan, the value of a coalition-wide network was made clear: greater situational awareness facilitated (or could facilitate) more effective decision-making. ISAF endorsed the AMN best practices as the "right model" for future coalition missions and forwarded the requirement to NATO and to the US Chairman of the Joint Chiefs of Staff.

On November 21, 2012, the NATO Military Committee agreed to the "Future Mission Network Concept," later described by the North Atlantic Council (NAC) as the basis for the development of an implementation plan that defined "the implications for NATO and the Nations." The concept provided overarching guidance for establishing a federated mission networking capability that enabled effective information sharing among NATO, NATO member nations, and/or non-NATO entities participating in operations. The FMN Concept describes the operational requirements, principles, and implementation considerations consisting of three components: Governance, FMN framework, and mission Networks.

The FMN Concept envisions a world in which the commander of an operation is able to conduct various processes and share information in a multi-nation environment. The commander must be able to communicate intent and direction down to the tactical level and provide reports and recommendations up to the strategic level. Information must be available throughout the coalition force in any foreseeable operational scenario, prioritising transparency and trust.

== Command implications ==
The operational commander's requirements are the preeminent driver of each mission Network. The FMN Concept identified six objectives that drive the operational requirements for nearly all mission networks:

1. Seamless human-to-human communication across the force.
2. A single view of the battle space across the Mission Network.
3. Timely provision of a mission Network.
4. Provision of consistent, secure, accurate and reliable mission data.
5. Community of Interest (COI) capabilities that align with the mission requirement(s).
6. Well-trained staff that can support an effective decision cycle and take full advantage of the systems provided.

A mission network must support the respective chain of command and the execution of relevant "mission threads" and it must respond to the Commander's "battle rhythm" during each phase of the operation. FMN defines four different types of environments:

- Collective training environment (CTE) for preparing forces ahead of a mission.
- Verification and validation environment (VVE) for testing any changes to procedures, applications and services.
- Operations planning environment (OPE) for supporting collaborative planning of coalition participants that is conducted prior to deployment.
- Mission execution environment (MEE) covers the actual deployment and instantiation of a federated mission network to support a specific operation.

The NATO FMN Implementation Plan identified the need for establishing a mission thread approach to provide consistent context for interoperability, training, planning, and mission activities to enhance the effectiveness of future operations and inform FMN implementation. As a result, the NATO Strategic Commands produced the NATO Mission Thread Capstone Concept. The implementation of this concept will impact the development of the doctrine, organization, training, and requires contributions and participation of the operational community.

== FMN Spiral Specifications ==
FMN Spiral Specifications define the technical and procedural framework for capability development. Each individual FMN Spiral Specification is developed based on a set of Spiral Objectives defined within the rolling FMN Spiral Specification Roadmap, that allocates individual capability enhancements to the Spiral Objectives and links them to corresponding operational and security requirements. The roadmap also identifies the specification components in which these enhancements are developed. FMN Spiral Specifications follow a rolling approach, incorporating continuous improvements to capabilities introduced in earlier spirals while introducing new enhancements to support evolving interoperability requirements.

The FMN Management Group approved the final FMN Spiral 6 Specification on November 6, 2025. The specification is published under the Creative Commons Attribution–NonCommercial 4.0 International license and consists of 53 procedural and technical instructions, references more than 400 standards, and will be implemented by FMN Affiliates with the objective of achieving increased interoperability n.l.t. 2030. FMN Spiral 6 focuses on improving situational awareness information sharing across joint, maritime, land, air, and cyberspace domains, and extends interoperability efforts to the tactical level. Building on earlier spirals, it introduces 77 new capability enhancements.

== National implementation ==
Each FMN affiliate is responsible for implementing its own capabilities that conform to FMN spiral Specifications.

Based on the lessons learned from operations in many coalitions, Belgium decided to formally affiliate with FMN early in March 2016. The implementation of this international initiative is drawn up using a pragmatic and holistic approach following the DOTMLPFI methodology. At this stage (Spiral 2 as of June 2019), Belgium disposes of a capability enabler (the Mission Defense Network), which offers minimum services to allow deployed troops to communicate, share, and exchange information with partners in a secure way, and automatically. Those services will be expanding with the following spiral development.

Canada's C4ISR Vision outlines the importance of interoperability with its Joint, Interagency, Multinational, and Public (JIMP) partners and sets strategic objectives to achieve it within both the enduring and episodic domains of its Military Integrated Information Infrastructure (MI3). Recognizing that FMN concepts and standards are key to achieving its goals, Canada is implementing the FMN Spiral specifications as part of its 'Canadian Deployable Mission Network' (CDMN) design. True operational interoperability takes more than just technology, so Canada champions the use of FMN-capable forces in all appropriate multilateral operations, exercises and events that it participates in as a way to ingrain interoperability as a fundamental aspect of modern operations.

Established in May 2020, the FMN 'French Roadmap for the Interoperability of Systems' in a Multinational Environment (FRISE) is the national FMN implementation programme within the French Ministry of Armed Forces. The main stakeholders from the Defense Staff (État-Major des Armées, EMA) and the Defense Procurement Directorate (Direction générale de l'armement, DGA) aim to align various national capability development activities with the FMN Initiative and contribute to its battle-rhythm.

The initiative 'German Mission Network' aims to create improved command and control capabilities for the German armed forces. The German Mission Network is fully compatible with NATO's Federated Mission Networking and merges the previously physically separated IT systems and services for deployments to a physically and logically interoperable and integrated multinational system of systems. The 'Harmonization of Command and Control Information Systems' program (Harmonisierung der Führungsinformationssysteme, HaFIS) is the first to spearhead this challenge with a planned successive enlargement to other projects over the following years.

In 2015, after formally affiliating with the FMN initiative, Italy approved the governance and management structure of the Italian FMN initiative, aiming to achieve the capability to set up and manage a mission network according to the FMN specifications. In 2016, Italy confirmed the compliance of the Italian FMN Node to FMN Spiral 1 requirements in a number of multinational exercises and has actively contributed to the development of the next set of capabilities. In light of the results achieved in 2016, Italy decided to implement the capability acquired in Afghanistan by deploying an FMN Node federated to the Afghanistan Mission Network (AMN), which is now fully operational. The Italian Ministry of Defence is also in the process of approving the implementation of an Italian Mission Network to fulfil the needs in terms of Command and Control of a mission or multinational operations (also in the role of "leading nation" of a coalition) or, in a dual-use perspective, in case of an emergency operation for humanitarian aid and disaster relief.

The Netherlands implemented the first set of agreed FMN capabilities (Spiral 1) within their deployable Theatre Independent Tactical Adaptive Armed Forces Network (TITAAN) which is used by the Dutch armed forces. Their next steps include further alignment with FMN capabilities and the implementation of future FMN spiral specifications within TITAAN. The Netherlands acknowledged that the implementation of federated capabilities needs a DOTMLPF-I perspective to be able to reach the next level of interoperability. The Dutch and German forces are collaborating, harmonizing requirements, procedures, education, and training. Federating capabilities provided by both nations in the context of the multinational 1 (GE/NL) Corps are a demonstration of the practical implementation of FMN.

Norway is seeking to adopt the entire concept of Federation and Networking from a DOTMLPF-I perspective. In practical terms this involves other agencies than those traditionally involved with development and implementation of C2 systems. In particular, the engagement of decision makers at Ministry of Defence level and operational planning staff at the highest level of operational command is considered to be essential. Regarding implementation of FMN technical aspects, Norway has chosen not to create a dedicated implementation programme. Instead, FMN Spiral Specifications will be injected into upgrades of existing systems and emerging projects.

Poland is implementing a Polish Mission Network (PMN) in accordance with FMN Spiral Specifications. It consists of a permanent Polish Mission Network Element to which units can connect their network extensions during national and multinational exercises. For the first time PMN was successfully implemented during Exercise Anakonda 2016 as the main part of a federation based on five Mission Network Elements. PMN instantiation is also being used by NATO's enhanced Forward Presence (eFP) as the capability ready for interoperability with NATO's NRF and VJTF.

In 2016, Sweden announced its intention to become an FMN Affiliate, hoping eventually to become Mission Network Extension participant. FMN constitutes an important basis for interoperability and the Swedish Armed Forces have stated that by 2023, Command and Control information system such as SWECCIS must be fully FMN compatible. Sweden recognize that future FMN spiral specifications will include additional requirements for evolving the Armed Forces' operational command support system to continue to be FMN compatible.

The United Kingdom has built upon its experiences in Afghanistan to develop mission configurable capabilities as described in Strategic Defence and Security Review 2015. This work aligns to FMN with the MAGPIE system utilizing FMN Spiral 1 Specification which is already in service with HQ ARRC. The New Style of IT (NSoIT) programme has subsumed the work initiated by the Information Superiority in Contingent Operations (ISCO) research programme and JACKDAW equipment programme to develop a configurable system that will meet the Spiral 2 specification and be readily updateable to future FMN spirals. Whilst MAGPIE is predominantly a land system, NSoIT will be deployed across the whole of the British Armed Forces.

The United States implementation program is known under the name of 'Mission Partner Environment' (MPE) and it reflects the US DoD's desire to be an FMN affiliate. From the technical perspective, the US DoD CIO's office has been working on the Mission Partner Environment Information System (MPE-IS), which provides the ability to change things quickly so that networks can be: set up quickly to support the joint force; broken down very quickly; and federated to exchange information in support of the joint force, the DoD and mission partners. MPE-IS aligns with NATO's FMN capability, enhancing the mission and ability to work with mission partners. Both FMN and the US MPE efforts started out under the moniker 'Future Mission Network' but underwent name changes in 2012 to avoid confusion due to an association with something that was 'always in the future' or limited to materiel oriented IT and network solutions.
