= Linear induction accelerator =

Linear induction accelerators utilize ferrite-loaded, non-resonant magnetic induction cavities. Each cavity can be thought of as two large washer-shaped disks connected by an outer cylindrical tube. Between the disks is a ferrite toroid. A voltage pulse applied between the two disks causes an increasing magnetic field which inductively couples power into the charged particle beam.

The linear induction accelerator was invented by Christofilos in the 1960s. Linear induction accelerators are capable of accelerating very high beam currents (>1000 A) in a single short pulse. They have been used to generate X-rays for flash radiography (e.g. DARHT at LANL), and have been considered as particle injectors for magnetic confinement fusion and as drivers for free electron lasers. A compact version of a linear induction accelerator, the dielectric wall accelerator, has been proposed as a proton accelerator for medical proton therapy.
