= STF =

STF may refer to:

== Concepts ==
- Spread tow fabric (stf), a type of lightweight fabric
- Smooth Trans Focus (STF), technology in photographic lenses that produces a smooth focus effect
  - STF function, an autobracketing function on certain cameras that emulates a Smooth Trans Focus effect

== Organisations ==
- She's the First, an organization that fights gender inequality
- Songahm Taekwondo Federation, the South American branch of the American Taekwondo Association
- Supreme Federal Court (Portuguese: Supremo Tribunal Federal), Brazil's supreme court
- Svenska Turistföreningen, the Swedish Tourist Association

== Special task forces ==
- Special Task Force (SAPS), a South African police tactical unit
- Special Task Force (Sri Lanka), Sri Lankan Police Counter-Terrorist force
- Special Task Force (India), various police special forces in India
- Special Tactical Force, a fictional anti-terrorist unit in Crisis Zone
- SchizoTaskForce, a special entertainment organization found in Germany that acts in games as STF.

== Other uses ==
- George M. Bryan Airport (FAA location identifier: STF) of Starkville, Mississippi
- Shear thickening fluid, a type of smart material whose viscosity increases as shear stress increases
- Stepover toehold facelock, a submission hold used in professional wrestling
- Common occupational injuries often result from accidents known as slips, trips and falls
