= Access Media Network =

American Mass Media Company

Access Media Network (AMN) is a business automation and technology organization unifying speech, music, audio, images and movies with two-way communications. The core definition of the AMN, founded by Dale Burleigh Schalow in 1992, was a premise for consumer-based music access, originally called Accessible Music Network. A new music industry model encompassed three main tiers at its inception: 1) method of travel including cable TV, telephony, satellite and cellular; 2) hardware and software to play music after point-of-purchase; 3) business licensing model to levy single license issue, as well as monthly subscription plans of multiple licenses.

== History ==
First version (1992) of AMN SoftPlayer: music-on-demand software.

The first demonstration of AMN's SoftPlayer was in 1992 by Schalow at Geffen Records on Sunset Boulevard in Hollywood, California. Soon thereafter Geffen and Bertelsmann Music Group created its highly visible New Media group. Schalow designed a completely self-contained version of AMN using nothing but stand-alone software on the Apple Macintosh to demonstrate how SCSI (small computer serial interface) could be used to implement a new technique called "music on demand". It supported AIF/C and QuickTime compression formats at the time. The sound quality was based on current compact disc (CD) standards: 16 bit frames, 44 kHz sampling, stereophonic (2 channels). Subsequent demos followed at BMG, Cablevision, Cox FiberNet, Continental Cable, Jones Intercable, Bell Atlantic, among others. Schalow's AMN was introduced to Apple Computer through the “I Changed the World” competition using an Apple IIci as the center of one controller-based network after which he received Honorable Mention and an Apple T-shirt.

During Schalow's research, he found many communications and entertainment companies were delivering content over a medium that was undervalued in terms of its interactive bandwidth. At first his self-study of the subject was done at the Beverly Hills Public Library where there were books and reference materials on existing technology but not nearly enough on interactive broadband. From his frustration, he traveled the country meeting with cable, telephone and entertainment developers and executives in Virginia, Research Triangle Park, New York, California, Denver and Pennsylvania discussing broadband theories and the concept of receiving true, instant music-on-demand. The information he received helped push the AMN envelope.

In 1994 Schalow was encouraged by the President of James Madison University to contact DC-area entrepreneurs for additional funding and planning a business incubation period. CACI's CEO acknowledges the technology in 1995 but could not find a fit for its government clients. So in 1995, Schalow's software was considered for a project for Magnet Interactive Studios (Georgetown). Schalow was hired to lead implementation of new compression technology for a multimedia title called "COMEDIANS: Behind The Laughter" (Magnet Interactive and 20th Century Fox Home Entertainment) where the application was used to squeeze tons of music, sound and 250,000+ SGI animation frames onto a single-sided CD-ROM ($1.2 million budget). It was reviewed by TIME Magazine's Entertainment Weekly as "so cleverly-designed video game programmers would do well to study it" (). Schalow disagreed that CD-ROMs alone would help market AMN over the long-term so another company was considered to help assist.

A small company in Tysons Corner, called Image Communications, hired Schalow as Director, Programming in 1996, understanding AMN was his privately held media technology R&D business. Several applications, including “MEDICINES: The Inside Story” (Carter Foundation/Glaxo), AT&T's Virtual Headset project, Software AG's image compression project, and the Pentagon's Renovation project using Federally mandated Accessibility standards (now under Section 508 () as part of the Rehabilitation Act of 1973), used AMN streaming audio recognition and synthesis technology.

AMN was briefly introduced to Sony Music in 1997. The company offered a web site featuring the online version of its “SoftPlayer” that supported MPEG compression, and was later reviewed by Wal-mart's IT management department in the Mid-West for integration with its Global Media Community for selling music online.

Between 1998 and 2000, the company began integrating its recording and player technology with other webs and devices. Agencies including FEI, FAI and DIA began integrating founder Schalow's streaming media technology for educational and training purposes using narrow and wide-band communications. Schalow participated with workflow processes that incorporated media technology and business distribution for companies like Xerox, Sony Music, Chiron, and PPD, and was awarded USI's product strategy group Innovation Award for designing and developing ObjectBroker for the company in 1999.

AMN's media brokering application for movie streaming and sharing application called MovieBroker was developed and released in 2001 to the consumer marketplace. Joint marketing partnership with Handango, Compaq, Microsoft and Amazon helped make the product available to users of Windows, PocketPC and the Web. The product was nominated as “Video Product of the Year” by PocketPC Magazine and its Panel of Experts in 2002, and it is estimated that there are over 200,000 copies of the Shareware version installed worldwide.

The U.S. Federal Government hired the company in 2002 as a consultant for web and media engineering for the HHS/NIH. Schalow was able to convince a preliminary panel of Managers and Technologists at the NLM his media technology would help support their very large user bases. The company released a Java ME version of MediaBroker(r) in late 2002. The product was covered by the press and media. In late 2003, the NIH released its “talking Web” for MedlinePlus and Senior Health public web resources. It was introduced to the press and public by the NIH Directorship and IC offices. The streaming voice recognition technology and visual processing interfaces have been reviewed and covered by several media and publications including NBC4 Digital Edge (DC), The Washington Post, and JAMA. A July/August IEEE paper was authored by AMN and the NIH and published in IT Professional for disclosure of the applied technology ().

Several contact inquiries were received of which Schalow helped to address with applied technology specifications and standards. Some of these acknowledgements and inquiries included Orange County, FL Public Library, AUCD, and MCI's SVP Technology Vint Cerf who was referred by a DC netpreneur. Vint asked his staff to read the paper for any possible alignment. Schalow also had discussions with Intel's Visual Processing, Mobility, Business and Wafer Mfg Automation Researchers. He helped devise recommendations to Andy Grove for his daily use of voice recognition software due to his mild motor impairment disabilities as a senior computer user.

AMN still participates in overall direction of the music industry including where Mashboxx, Napster, RIAA and wireless media with the law are headed. AMN also discusses the future impact of medical research using embedded media technologies with Intel's Proactive Health Researchers, as well as a follow-up to the white paper “Speakable RFID” authored for validation of Matrics’ sale to Symbol as guided by potential investor The Carlyle Group.

There is a possibility of using visible actors and talent to further improve AMN's concatenative voice synthesis in the digital media/entertainment businesses. Speech recognition to access media over land and air is also in staging developments to address mobility and long-range wireless applications, such as those to be encountered not only with earth-based disability markets, but in aeronautical and space exploration as well.

== Bibliography ==
Ramage, S., 5 August 2005, United Kingdom: Music Performers and Their Protection, New Hall, Cambridge University, IP Workshop

U.S. National Library of Medicine (NIH), 23 October 2003, NIH Launches NIHSeniorHealth.gov ()

Edwards, John, 18 April 2003, "Turning Mobile Phones into Media Players"(), PriceWaterhouse/Coopers Media Analysis, The Hollywood Reporter Magazine

GlaxoWellcome/Carter Foundation, 1997, Medicines: The Inside Story (CDROM), Teacher's Edition, Ferbank Museum Exhibit, Atlanta, GA (United States)
