= Australian Imperial Force =

Australian Imperial Force may refer to:

- First Australian Imperial Force, raised in 1914 to fight in World War I, and disbanded in 1921
- Second Australian Imperial Force, raised in 1939 to fight in World War II, and ceasing to exist in 1947
