= Preventive maintenance checks and services =

Preventive maintenance checks and services (PMCS) in the United States Army or preventive maintenance inspections (PMI) in the United States Air Force are the checks, services, and maintenance performed before, during, and after any type of movement or before the use of all types of military equipment.

== Description ==
Most pieces of military equipment have PMCS charts used to go over every detail needed or noted to ensure the proper function of every mechanical item or non-mechanical surface. A PMCS check is required before, during, and after a piece of equipment or vehicle is used. Checks are also done at weekly, monthly, semi-annual, annual, or bi-annual intervals, depending on the specific part.

Doing a PMCS check every time equipment is used may reduce the number of failures. This reduces the number of injuries during training exercises, improve effectiveness in combat, and increase the operator's ability to implement their equipment.

A PMCS is required before a vehicle can be dispatched and before a piece of equipment, such as a weapon, can be issued. A PMCS sheet, as listed above, for vehicles is called a DA 5988E. This sheet is used to write down any deficiency found during the PMCS procedure. The steps taken to perform the PMCS are explained in a Technical Manual and performed by the operator. A PMCS is also used at the unit level.
