= CENTRIXS =

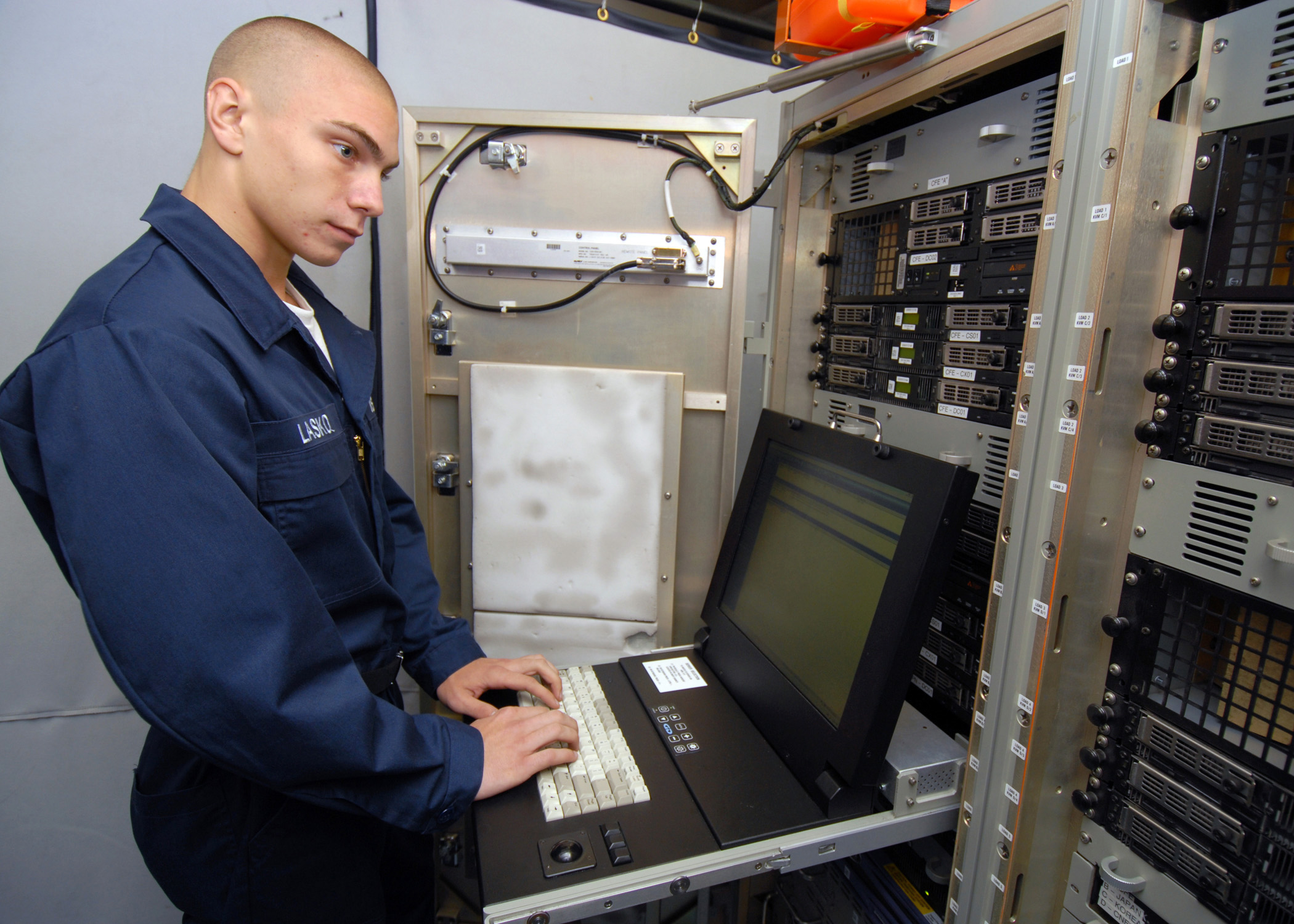
CENTRIXS being used on the USS Abraham Lincoln

The Combined Enterprise Regional Information Exchange System (CENTRIXS) is a collection of classified coalition networks, called enclaves, that enable information sharing through the use of email and Web services, instant messaging or chat, the Common Operational Picture service, and Voice over IP. CENTRIXS supports combatant commands throughout the world, including the U.S. Indo-Pacific, Central and European commands.

Some of the CENTRIXS networks are:

- CENTRIXS Four Eyes (CFE) for the US, Britain, Canada and Australia
- CENTRIXS-J for the United States and Japan
- CENTRIXS-K for the United States and South Korea
- CENTRIXS-ISAF for the International Security Assistance Force (ISAF) in Afghanistan
- CENTRIXS-GCTF for the Troop Contributing Nations of the Global Counter-Terrorism Force (GCTF)
- CENTRIXS-CMFC for the Combined Maritime Forces, Central Command (CMFC)
- CENTRIXS-CMFP for the Cooperative Maritime Forces, Pacific (CMFP)

== History ==
United States Central Command (USCENTCOM) began envisioning and exploring a coalition data-sharing network in early 1999.

At the onset of the global war on terrorism, as USCENTCOM prepared to conduct Operation Enduring Freedom (OEF) in late 2001, efforts focused on speeding the development of just such a network. Additionally, the global nature of the war on terrorism demanded that CENTRIXS become a global multinational information sharing initiative.

The CENTRIXS Program Office (CPMO) was established by the Office of the Assistant Secretary of Defense for Networks and Information Integration in late January 2002. The CPMO was responsible for coordinating the planning, resources, and implementation of CENTRIXS world-wide to support the combatant commands.

Most CENTRIXS-ISAF and CENTRIXS-GCTF have been migrated to the newly created CENTCOM Partner Network (CPN).
