= Light anti-tank weapon =

Light anti-tank weapon or Light anti-armor weapon may refer to:

- a weapon in anti-tank warfare
- LAW 80 / LAW 94, British single-use anti-tank projectile system
- M72 LAW, American single-use anti-tank projectile system
- NLAW / MBT-LAW, Swedish single-use anti-tank missile system
