= Afghanistan Mission Network =

- Formation: January 2010
- Dissolved: August 2021
- Purpose: Enabling better Command and Control, decision making and information sharing by connecting coalition forces in the Afghanistan AOR.
- Headquarters: AMN Secretariat
- Location: Mons, Belgium
- Region served: Afghanistan
- Products: AMN Joining, Membership and Exit Instructions (JMEIs)
- Fields: Command and Control, Standardization, ICT Service Management
- Owner: NATO

The Afghanistan Mission Network (AMN) served as the primary Coalition, Command, Control, Communications, Computers, Intelligence, Surveillance, and Reconnaissance (C5ISR) network for NATO-led missions in Afghanistan (ISAF, RSM). By providing a common network over which to share critical information, the AMN enabled a shift in information-sharing posture from "need to know" to "need to share," resulting in an increase in situational awareness among coalition partners. AMN established a common information sharing platform that provided standardised IT services such as email, instant messaging or chat, Common Operational Picture service, VTC, Voice over IP and Web Services for document sharing and application integration to all coalition participants. The effort generated invaluable lessons in how to approach coalition networking in future operations. Based on those lessons learned with AMN, NATO institutionalized the 'federated' approach under the Federated Mission Networking initiative.

== History ==
Initially British Forces integrated their national mission network, called "Overtask" with the NATO provided coalition network. From end 2008 to October 2009 a combined team of United States Central Command, NATO Consultation, Command and Control Agency and NATO Communications and Information Systems Services Agency interconnected the coalition network provided by NATO with the Combined Enterprise Regional Information Exchange System (CENTRIXS) of the US. By end of 2009 the federation concept had proven to be feasible and effective and the Afghanistan Mission Network was formally established in January 2010, when the commander of the ISAF Joint Command issued the order "Migration to the Afghanistan Mission Network" to all subordinated elements.

== Coalition Partner Contributions ==
NATO collectively provided the core mission network element of the AMN to which network contributing coalition participants interconnect their own networks. When the AMN was first established in January 2010 the AMN core was already federated with the CENTRIXS-ISAF (CX-I) network contributed by the United States and the OVERTASK network of the United Kingdom. The first coalition participants joining the AMN in 2010 were Canada with the Land Command Support System (LCSS) and Italy with CAESARNet. In May 2011, France became the fifth nation that connected its command network to the AMN. One month later on 11 June 2011 Germany and Norway interconnected their networks (known as DEUAMN and NORAX) with the AMN core. The AMN grew quickly (~90000 users in May 2011) and many coalition participants such as Spain, Turkey, Poland, Finland, Sweden, Denmark, Australia, and the Czech Republic joined the AMN with their own national network extensions. By the end of 2011 48 NATO and Partner Nations operated on AMN. Following the completion of the ISAF mission in December 2014, the Resolute Support Mission (RSM) was launched in January 2015. AMN continued to be the primary mission network for the forces that were part of RSM. All AMN points-of-presence within Afghanistan were closed down as part of the withdrawal of all RSM forces in August 2021.
