= VADS =

VADS can refer to:

- VADS (organisation), UK organisation that provides digital images and resources available free for use in UK Higher and Further Education
- VADS Berhad, a Malaysian IT Company formed as a joint venture between Telekom Malaysia and IBM
- Vulcan Air Defense System, two anti-aircraft weapons used by the United States Army:
  - M163 VADS, a self-propelled anti-aircraft gun (SPAAG)
  - M167 VADS, a towed, short-range anti-aircraft gun
- Verdix Ada Development System (VADS)
