= Five paragraph order =

Style of organizing information of military situation

The five paragraph order or five paragraph field order is a style of organizing information about a military situation for a unit in the field. It is an element of Canadian Army, United States Army, United States Marine Corps and United States Navy Seabees small unit tactics, and similar order styles are used by military groups around the world. An order specifies the instruction to a unit in a structured format that makes it easy to find each specific requirement. The five paragraphs can be remembered with the acronym SMEAC: "S" Situation, "M" Mission, "E" Execution, "A" Administration/Logistics, "C" Command/Signal.

There are a number of subtypes of these field orders, based on knowledge patterns specific to individual military branches. Each subtype has its own acronym. Most are based on a METT-TC analysis (Mission, Enemy, Troops, Terrain, Time Available, and Civilian considerations). In addition, the Marines use the BAMCIS process (Begin the Planning, Arrange Recon, Make Recon, Complete Planning, Issue Order, Supervise) while the Army uses the eight Troop Leading Procedures (Receive the Mission, Issue a Warning Order, Make a Tentative Plan, Start Necessary Movement, Reconnoiter, Complete the Plan, Issue the Operations Order, Supervise) before executing operations in support of a mission, which is not limited to a potential enemy engagement.

Supervision is the most important step from the BAMCIS acronym. It provides a structure for the unit to be able to understand and execute the mission of the unit leader. It is different from other instruction from higher authority in that it is given orally, instead of being issued as written orders. Officers and non-commissioned officers also use it informally to communicate relevant information before a non-combat movement (e.g. administrative travel/convoy, field exercise movements, weapon re-qualification, liberty, etc.).

== Format ==
Outline of five paragraph order:

=== Situation ===
- A. Enemy Forces
  1. Enemy's Composition, Disposition, Strength
  2. Enemy's Capabilities & Limitations:(DRAW-DG) Defend, Reinforce, Attack, Withdraw, Delay, Gas
  3. Enemy's Most Likely Course Of Action (EMLCOA)
  4. Enemy's Most Dangerous Course of Action
- B. Friendly Forces
  1. Higher's Mission & Intent
  2. Adjacent Units
    - North/South/East/West
    - Same Echelon
  3. Supporting
- C. Attachments/Detachment
- D. Civil/Terrain considerations

=== Mission ===
Who, What (Tactical Task), Where, When, and Why?

=== Execution ===
- A. Commander's Intent
  1. Center of Gravity
  2. Critical Vulnerability
  3. Exploitation Plan
  4. Desired Endstate
- B. Concept of the Operations
  1. Scheme of Maneuver
  2. Fire Support Plan
- C. Tasks
- D. Coordinating Instructions

=== Administration/Logistics ===
(Service Support in the Army version)

- A. Administration – "Bad Guys & Bandages": Enemy Prisoners of War ("EPW") & Casualty evacuation ("Casevac") Plans
- B. Logistics – "Beans, Bullets, & Batteries": Food, Ammunition, Supply, Communications, Pyrotechnics, etc.

=== Command/Signal ===
(Command and Signal in the Army version)

- A. Signal
  1. Primary
  2. Alternate
  3. Contingency
  4. Emergency
- B. Command
  1. Location of Key Leaders
  2. Succession of Command

Since Marines and soldiers work in small teams, it is important that each member know and understand the order in its entirety so as to be aware of which parts of the order apply directly to them and the subordinate unit to which they belong without being exceedingly aware of minute details provided for general situational awareness.

== Example SMEAC ==
=== 1. Situation ===
- Enemy Forces:
  - An estimated enemy fire team is operating in Sector 4.
  - They are armed with assault rifles and light machine guns.
  - They are currently fortifying a checkpoint at Grid 123-456.
- Friendly Forces:
  - 1st Platoon is holding the western high ground to provide overwatch.
  - 2nd Squad is acting as our Quick Reaction Force (QRF) at Patrol Base Alpha.
- Attachments/Detachments:
  - One forward drone operator is attached to our squad for real-time reconnaissance.

=== 2. Mission ===
- Who: 1st Squad, Alpha Company.
- What: Attack and clear the enemy checkpoint.
- Where: Intersection of Route Gold and Route Silver (Grid 123-456).
- When: Operation commences at 0430 hours tomorrow.
- Why: To open a supply corridor for the main battalion advance.

=== 3. Execution ===
- Concept of Operations: This section outlines the general plan, usually broken down into phases (such as movement to the objective, the actions taken at the objective, and the withdrawal or consolidation).
- Tasks to Subordinate Units: Each team or element is assigned specific responsibilities to ensure the mission's objectives are met.
- Coordinating Instructions: Includes timing, movement routes, and safety protocols relevant to all members of the unit.

=== 4. Administration & Logistics ===
- Supply: Details requirements for equipment, food, and water necessary for the duration of the mission.
- Medical: Outlines the plan for providing first aid and the location of collection points for those requiring further care.
- Transportation: Describes how personnel and equipment will be moved to and from the operational area.

=== 5. Command & Signal ===
- Command: Establishes the chain of command and the location of leaders during different phases of the operation.
- Signal: Defines the primary and secondary methods of communication, including radio frequencies, hand signals, or pyrotechnic signals for specific actions like shifting or ceasing activity.

== Variants ==
The British armed forces use a similar system subdivided into:

- Preliminaries – This involves the orders group going to the platoon commander and receiving their orders for their section and finding out about their commanders plans for the platoon as a whole. This stage also involves the second-in-command of a section preparing them for battle. This includes all ammunition checks ensuring all of the sections equipment is in working order and that the section is camouflaged and hydrated. This is done from the mnemonic PAWPERSO: Protection, Ammunition, Weapons, Personal Camouflage, Equipment, Radios, Specialist Equipment, Orders

This is done by the section commander. If the second-in-command has any spare time after this he will prepare a detailed model for the briefing of the troops.

- Ground – Now that the section commanders have received orders from the platoon commander they return to their sections to deliver their briefing. He or she will use the model provided for by the second-in-command to give a brief description of the ground on which the mission will take place. He will explain contours and possible cover for the route in and how it will be exploited to avoid enemy detection.
- Situation – This is similar to the American system in that it includes the enemy situation as well as friendly forces situation. When This part of the briefing is given possible enemy-locations, forces, strength, ammunition, weapons, supply routes, watering points, patrol routes, objectives, morale, and motivation.
- Mission – This is a one sentence statement that summarises the mission objectives. For example, The mission to is to conduct a fighting patrol in order to eliminate any enemy positions so that the platoon can keep advancing into enemy territory safely. The mission statement is extremely important as it is more than likely the only bit of the briefing squaddies are bothered to listen to. So make it short sharp and to the point. You must always repeat the mission twice so that any squaddies not paying attention have a chance to catch what it is they are meant to be doing.
- Execution – If a briefing is considered to be a sandwich this would be considered the filling. It should be the longest part of the briefing and will explain in detail exactly what is going to be done under all conditions. This means the first plan of attack and any thing that will be done if the plan is compromised in any way for example if something unexpected happens. The section commander will explain the plan in a series of logical commands. it starts as follows

Platoon HQ is located on the model
Enemy position located
Patrol Form up point located
Bearing for departure located
Time out given
Route to enemy position pointed out
Any RV points are given according to the ground
Advanced information on Enemy is given
Plan of Attack is given
Location of possible ReOrg given
Route back in pointed out (always different from route in so not ambushed by enemy)
Bearing of way into Patrol harbour or Platoon HQ given
Time Back Given
Actions on given e.g. action on light during night is to get to ground
Actions on Vehicle-Light-Ambush-Fire-Separation-Lost-No Comms-Pinned Down-Weapon Stoppage-Run Out Of Ammo- etc
An official list does exist and it is much longer; however, these are the major features.

- Service Support – This is to do with all equipment that is needed specifically for the mission. This ranges from personal clothing to technical possibilities of any possible support weapons. This is a quick section which allows each member of the section to know exactly what to bring. Remember; if you are giving orders for a recce patrol, remind your section to wear warm kit, because if they die from the cold it's on you. This should have all been prepared by the second-in-command during the prelims, but you have to check.
- Command and signal – This section involves mainly two things: everything to do with radios, and all passwords and code names and signals which may be used during the patrol.

The radio section involves radio checks and ensuring the frequency is correct and that any change in frequency happens at exactly 23:59 right before midnight. Call signs for the radio network are handed out just remember that the platoon commander is always zero. The majority of the time the sections go in alpha numerical order e.g., section 1's point man is 1,1 second person is 1,2 and the third is 1,3 and so on through all three sections for the platoon. It is important that voice procedures are followed so that no information can be gained by the enemy over the radio waves.

The password and code name section for the command and signals orders involves giving out the password for the return journey so that the sentry does not shoot you when you return. This should only be a last resort as if the enemy hears it they could pretend to be a part of the section. Generally a sentry knows roughly what time you are coming back, due to the platoon commander informing him.

- Questions – These are to and from the patrol to ensure they understand what you said. Remember; when asking a question, pose, pause, pounce. So give them a question, see who looks like they know the answer, then ask someone who looks nervous because they were not paying attention.

== See also ==
- Operations order
- Intent (military)
