= Grenade launcher =

Weapon designed to fire large-caliber explosive, smoke, or gas projectiles

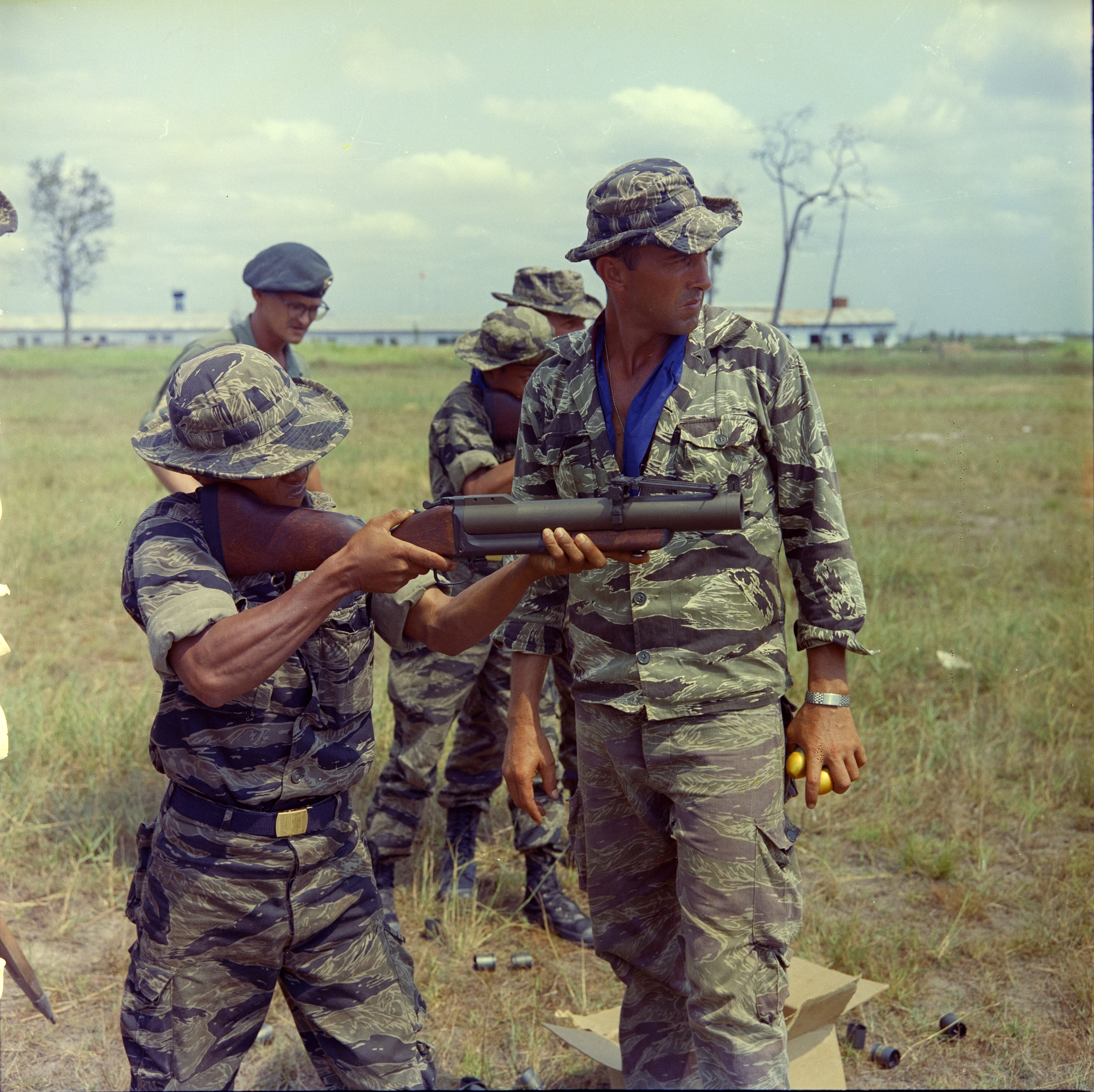
A United States Army Special Forces advisor instructing a Vietnamese Civilian Irregular Defense Group trainee on how to use an M79 grenade launcher

A grenade launcher is a weapon that fires a specially designed, large caliber projectile, often with an explosive, smoke, or gas warhead. Today, the term generally refers to a class of dedicated firearms firing unitary grenade cartridges - for example the widely used 40mm type. The most common type are man-portable, shoulder-fired weapons issued to individuals, although larger crew-served launchers are issued at higher levels of organization by military forces.

Grenade launchers are produced in the form of standalone weapons (either single shot or repeating) or as attachments mounted to a parent firearm, usually a rifle. Larger crew-served automatic grenade launchers such as the Mk 19 are mounted on tripods or vehicles.

Some armored fighting vehicles also mount fixed arrays of short-range, single-shot grenade launchers as a means of defense.

== History ==
=== Early precursors ===
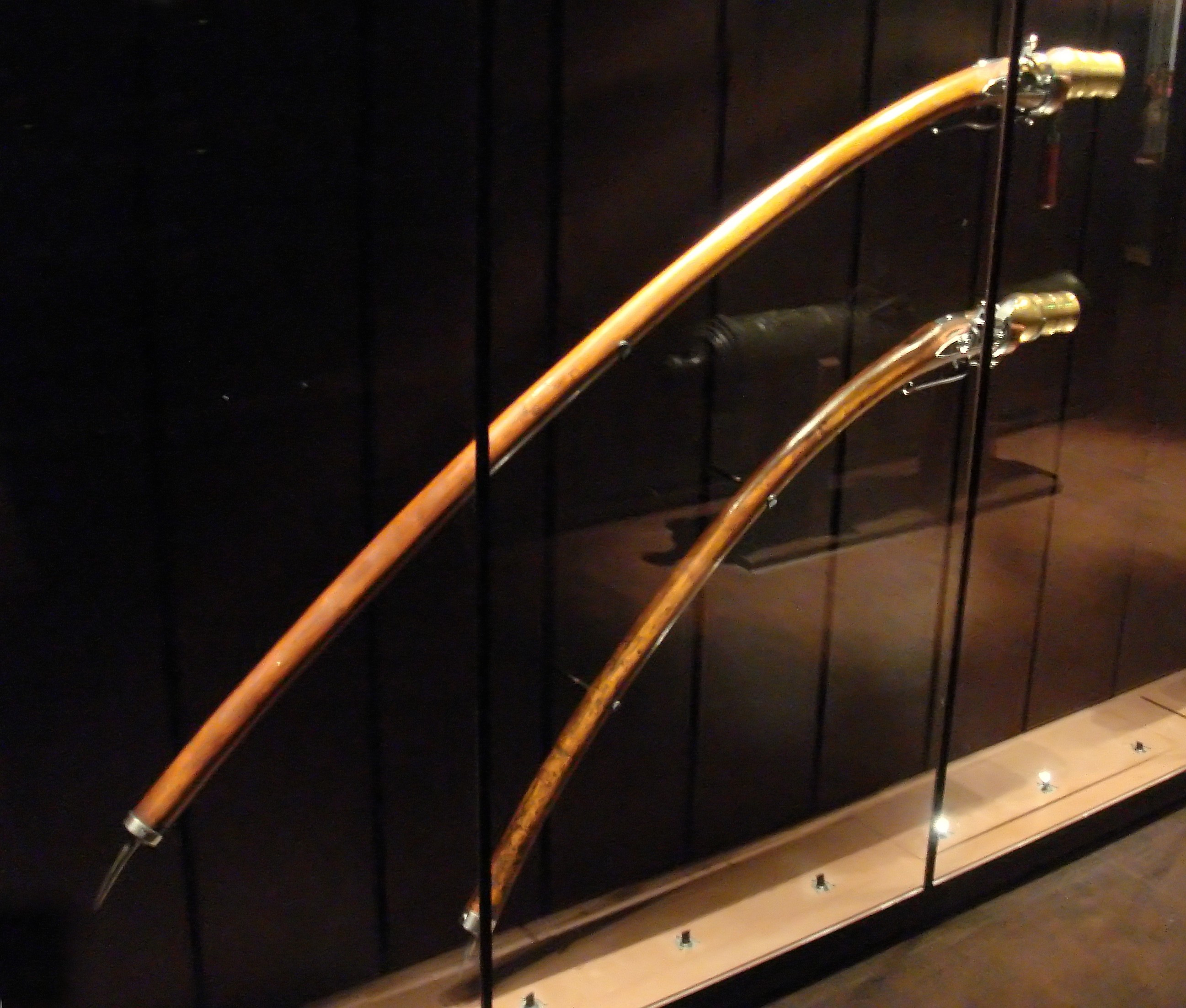
French grenade launchers from 1747

The earliest devices that could be referred to as grenade launchers were slings, which could be used to throw early grenado fuse bombs. The ancestors of modern ballistic grenade launchers, however, were simplistic muzzle-loading devices using a stake-like body to mount a short, large-bore gun barrel into which an explosive or incendiary device could be inserted; these were later refined into shoulder-fired blunderbuss-like firearms referred to as "hand mortars". These weapons were not highly regarded due to their unreliability, requiring the user to ignite a fuse on the projectile before firing, and with a substantial risk of the explosive failing to leave the barrel; attempts to ignite the fuse on firing using the gunpowder charge resulted in weapons that would often force the fuse into the grenade and make it explode in the barrel.

=== Hand grenade launchers ===
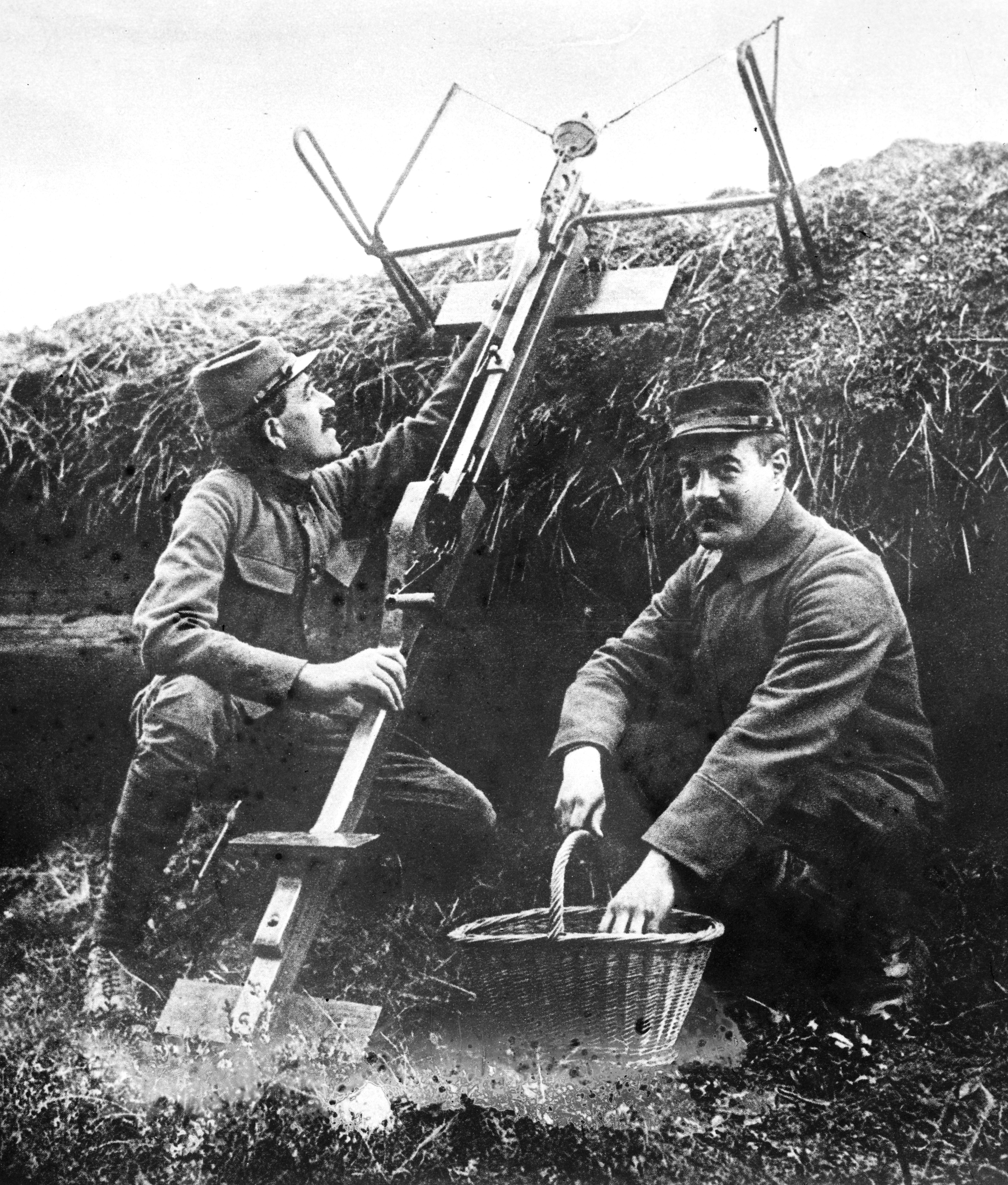
French soldiers with a Sauterelle, c. 1915

During the First World War, several novel crew-served launchers designed to increase the range of infantry hand grenades were developed, such as the Sauterelle crossbow, the West spring gun, and the Leach trench catapult devices. None were particularly effective, and such devices were ultimately replaced by light mortar systems such as the Stokes mortar, while the task of increasing the range of infantry explosive projectiles was primarily taken by rifle grenades.

A late example of such a system was the Japanese Type 91 grenade, which could be used as a thrown hand grenade, or fitted with adaptors to either be fired as a rifle grenade or used as a projectile by the Type 89 grenade discharger, a light infantry mortar.

=== Rifle grenades ===
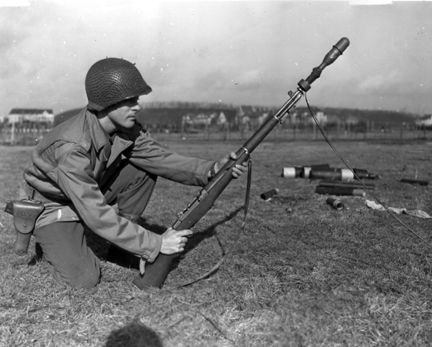
Rifle grenade on an M1 Garand

A new method of launching grenades was developed during the First World War and used throughout World War II. The principle was to use the soldier's standard rifle as an ersatz mortar, mounting a grenade (in many older cases an infantry hand grenade) fitted with a propelling charge, using an adaptor or socket on the weapon's muzzle or inside a mounted launching cup, and usually firing with the weapon's stock resting on the ground. For older rifle grenades, igniting the charge generally required loading the parent rifle with a special blank propellant cartridge, though modern rifle grenades can be fired using live rounds using "bullet trap" and "shoot through" systems.

The system has some advantages; since it does not have to fit in a weapon's barrel, the warhead can be made larger and more powerful compared to that of a unitary grenade round, and the rifle's weight and handling characteristics are not affected as with underbarrel systems unless a grenade is actually mounted. While older systems required the soldier to carry a separate adaptor or cup to attach to the rifle to make it ready to launch (such as the German Schiessbecher), later rifle grenades were often designed to attach to the standard factory-mounted flash hider of the parent rifle; for example, the NATO-standardized 22 mm rifle grenade can be mounted to most post-WWII Western military rifles without the need for an adaptor.

The disadvantage of this method is that when soldiers want to launch grenades, they must mount the grenade to the muzzle prior to each shot. If they are surprised by a close-range threat while preparing to fire the grenade, they have to reverse the procedure before they can respond with rifle fire. Due to the lack of a barrel, rifle grenades also tend to be more difficult to fire accurately compared to under-barrel or stand-alone designs.

Prior to the development of lightweight disposable antitank weapons such as the M72 LAW, large HEAT rifle grenades such as the ENERGA were the preferred method for allowing infantry who were not part of dedicated antitank teams to engage vehicles. Rifle grenades have largely fallen out of favor since the late 1960s and early 1970s, replaced in most of their traditional roles by dedicated grenade launchers, though a recent resurgence in interest in such devices for special purposes has occurred.

== Types ==
=== Stand-alone ===
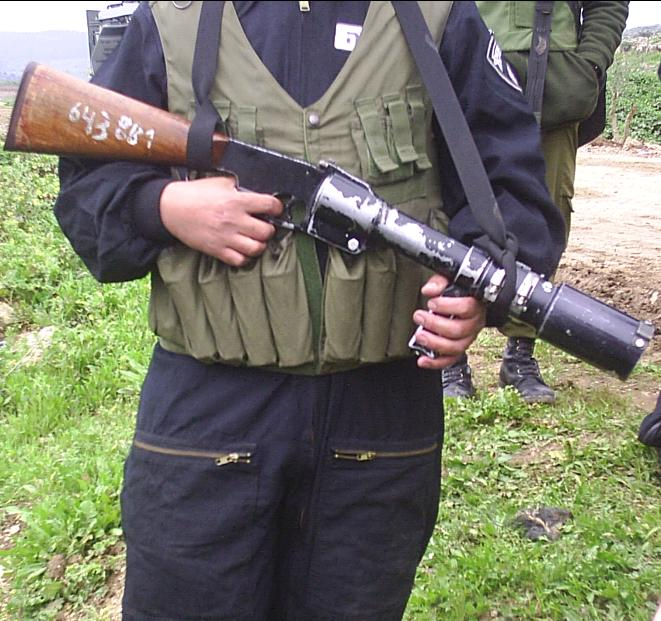
Israeli Border Guard with a Federal M201-Z 37 mm riot gun

The earliest examples of stand-alone grenade launchers in the modern sense were breech-loading riot guns designed to launch tear gas grenades and baton rounds, such as the Federal Riot Gun developed in the 1930s. One of the first examples of a dedicated breech-loading launcher for unitary explosive grenade rounds was the M79 grenade launcher, a result of the American Special Purpose Individual Weapon program (specifically the 40×46mm grenade round developed during Project NIBLICK, applying the German-developed high–low system to produce manageable recoil). The goal for the M79 was the production of a device with greater range than a rifle grenade but more portable than a mortar. Such single-shot devices were largely replaced in military service with underbarrel grenade launchers, removing the need for a dedicated grenadier with a special weapon. Many modern underbarrel grenade launchers can, however, also be used in standalone configurations with suitable accessories fitted; this is of particular preference for groups using submachine guns as their primary armament, since it is rarely practical to mount an underbarrel launcher on such a weapon. Single shot launchers are also still commonly used in riot control operations.

Heavier multi-shot grenade launchers like the ARWEN 37 are used as tear gas and smoke projectors in riot control, while military launchers like the Milkor MGL are used to provide heavy sustained firepower to infantry; most such devices, dating back to the Manville machine-projector, use a revolver-style cylinder, though a handful of pump-action weapons built like oversized shotguns, such as the China Lake grenade launcher and GM-94, also exist. Magazine-fed semi-automatic designs such as the Neopup PAW-20 and XM25 CDTE have also been created for military use, using smaller rounds (respectively 20 and 25mm) for purposes of practicality in terms of the size of the magazine, and reduced collateral damage compared to 40mm rounds.

The arms manufacturer Rheinmetall plans to start serial production of their magazine-fed fully-automatic grenade launcher SSW40 later in 2025.

=== Attached ===
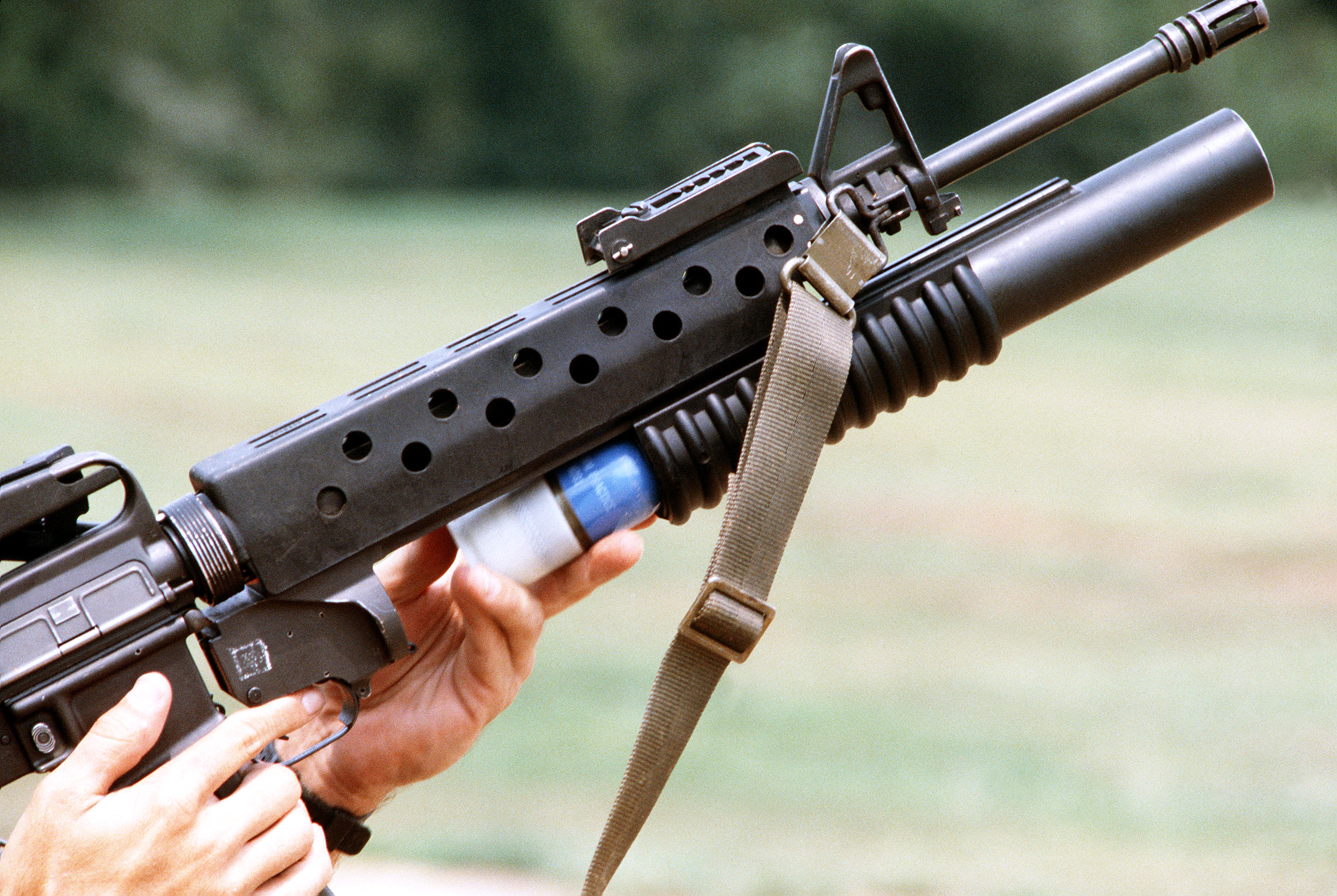
Loading an M203 attached to an M16A1 with a practice round

Since grenade launchers require relatively low internal pressure and only a short barrel, a lightweight launcher can be mounted under the barrel of a traditional rifle; this type of device is referred to as an underbarrel or underslung grenade launcher. This reduces the weight the soldier must carry by eliminating the grenade launcher's buttstock and makes the grenade launcher available for use at a moment's notice. Underbarrel 40 mm grenade launchers generally have their own trigger group; to fire, one simply changes grips, disengages the safety, and pulls the trigger. In Western systems, the barrel slides forward or pivots to the side to allow reloading; most fire a 40×46mm grenade cartridge. Soviet and Russian launchers are instead loaded from the muzzle, with the cartridge casing affixed to the projectile in the style of a mortar shell. For aiming, underbarrel grenade launchers typically use a separate ladder, leaf, tangent or quadrant sight attached to the launcher or the rifle, either to one side of the handguard or on top of the handguard in between the iron sights. Modern launchers often have the option of mounting more sophisticated aiming systems, such as ballistic rangefinders and day / night sights.

As with the M79, the concept of mounting a dedicated grenade launcher to a service rifle has its roots in the Special Purpose Individual Weapon program; though the experimental Colt XM148 grenade launcher had been produced earlier, it had proved too problematic to adopt. One AAI submission for SPIW mounted a "simple" single-action, single-shot breech-loading underbarrel grenade launcher in lieu of the required semi-automatic multi-shot device. With refinement, this was adopted as the M203 grenade launcher in 1968. A variety of lengths of M203 are available along with numerous parts kits to fit it to various rifles aside from the AR15 pattern weapons it was designed for.

More modern Western grenade launchers address some of the shortcomings of the M203, such as the sliding breech limiting the weapon's ability to load outsize projectiles and the lack of factory-fitted sight mounts, with designs like FN Herstal's ELGM and Heckler & Koch's AG36 featuring a swing-out breech to provide better access, integral sight mounts, and built-in support for standalone conversion. A variant of the latter weapon, the M320 Grenade Launcher Module, was salvaged from the failed XM8 program and adopted in 2008 as the US military's replacement for the M203.

Soviet development of an underbarrel launcher for the AK rifle series began in 1966 and in 1978 produced the GP-25, a muzzle-loading device for the AK-74 rifle using a mortar-like grenade round which functions by venting its propellant through holes in the base; this is a variation of the high-low system used by Western rounds, with the base of the projectile acting as the high-pressure chamber and the launcher's barrel acting as the low-pressure chamber. Further developments led to the GP series of grenade launchers.

A number of experimental weapon systems have attempted to produce combination weapons which consist of a permanently attached grenade launcher and a carbine assault rifle, often with the rifle mounted underneath the launcher, most notably the XM29 OICW, but so far the only such weapon to reach full production is the S&T Daewoo K11, adopted in limited numbers by the South Korean military.

=== Automatic ===
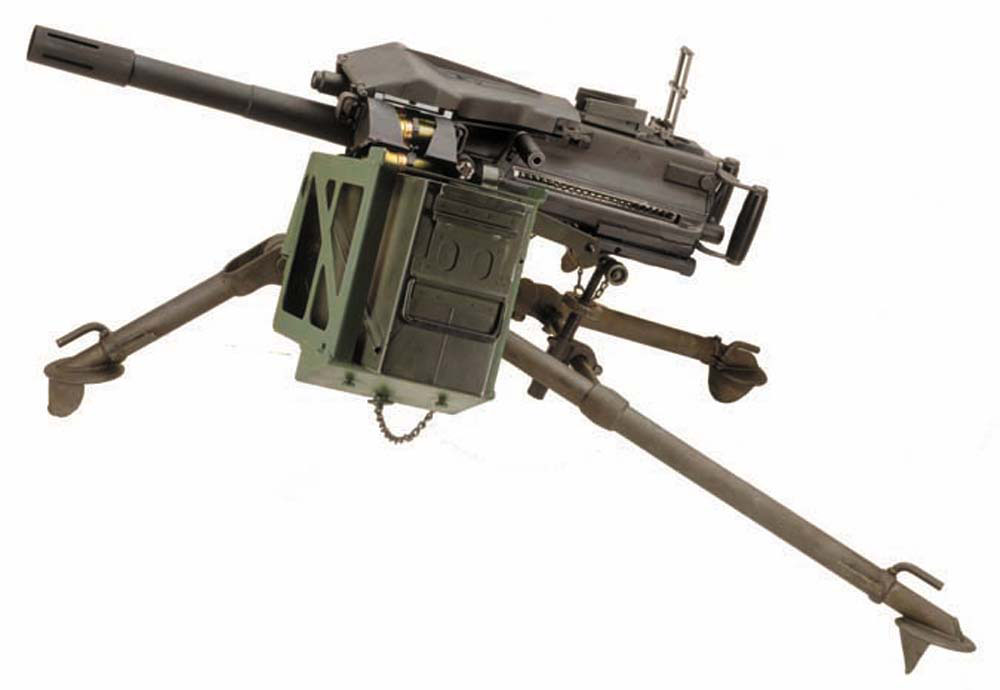
Mk 19 grenade launcher

An automatic grenade launcher or grenade machine gun is a crew-served support weapon which fires explosive rounds in quick succession from an ammunition belt or large-capacity magazine. As most are heavy weapons, they are normally attached to a tripod or vehicle mounting, and as well as being used to provide heavy suppressing fire in the manner of a heavy machine gun, also have sufficient firepower to destroy vehicles and buildings. Examples include the Mk 19, AGS-17, and the HK GMG.

Automatic grenade launchers generally use a higher-velocity round than infantry weapons; NATO launchers use a 40×53mm grenade round rather than the 40×46mm round used by infantry. There are exceptions to this rule: the crank-operated Mk 18 Mod 0 grenade launcher, a unique example of an AGL which was not fully automatic, and the Mk 20 Mod 0 grenade launcher both used the 40×46mm round, and the Chinese Type 87 grenade launcher, a device intended to be employed like a general-purpose machine gun, uses the same 35×32mm low-velocity grenade round as the QLG91B underbarrel launcher for the QBZ-95 assault rifle.

=== Fixed arrays ===
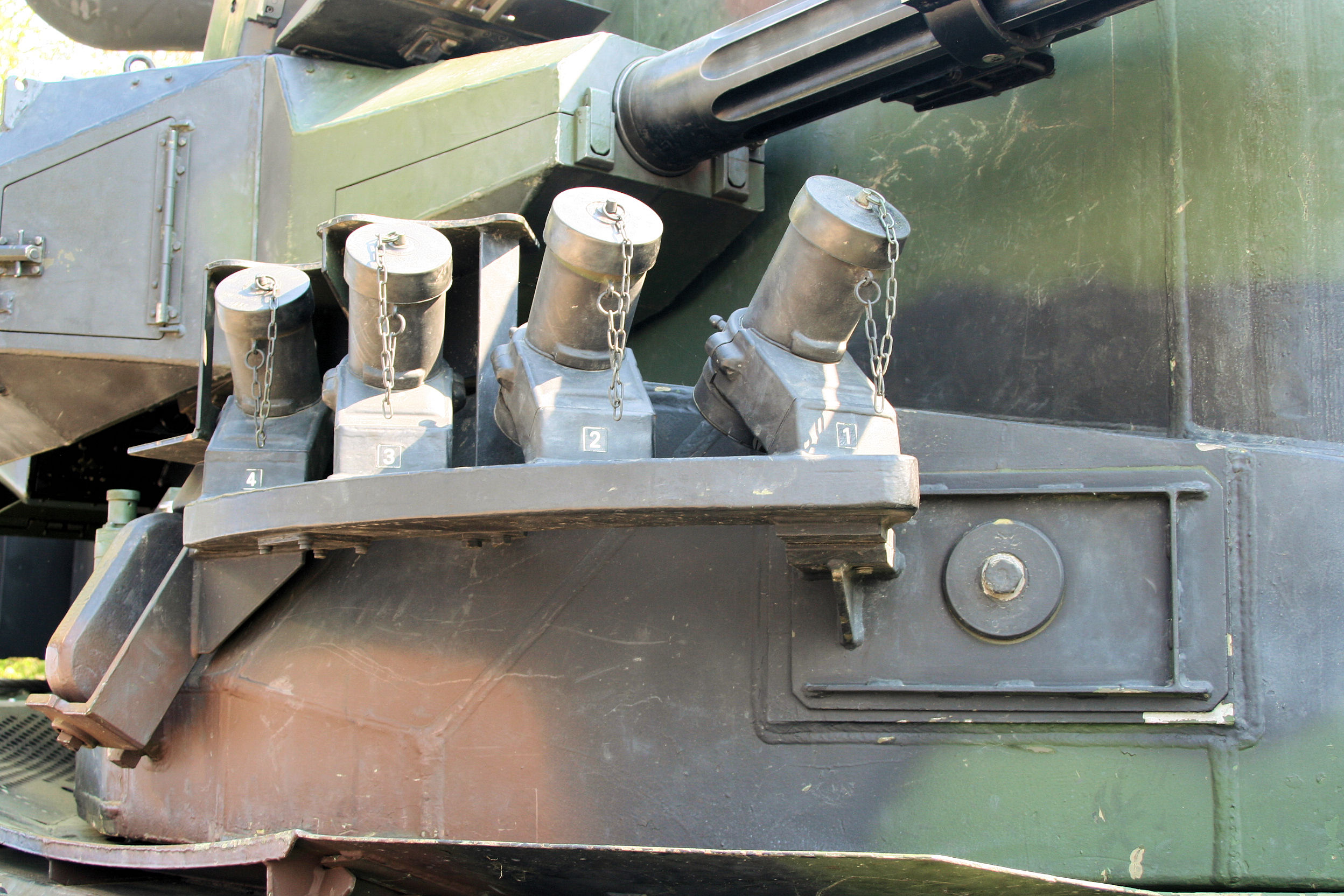
76mm smoke grenade launchers on a German Flakpanzer Gepard anti-aircraft vehicle

Some armored fighting vehicles also mount fixed arrays of short range, single-shot grenade launchers as a means of defense. These devices usually fire smoke grenades to conceal the vehicle behind a smoke screen, though can also be loaded with chaff, flares, or anti-personnel grenades to repel infantry attacks. Vehicle-mounted smoke grenade launchers are also known as smoke (grenade) dischargers. Some World War II examples of these devises are the German Nebelkerzenabwurfvorrichtung, Nebelwurfgerät, Minenabwurfvorrichtung and Nahverteidigungswaffe.

== Ammunition ==
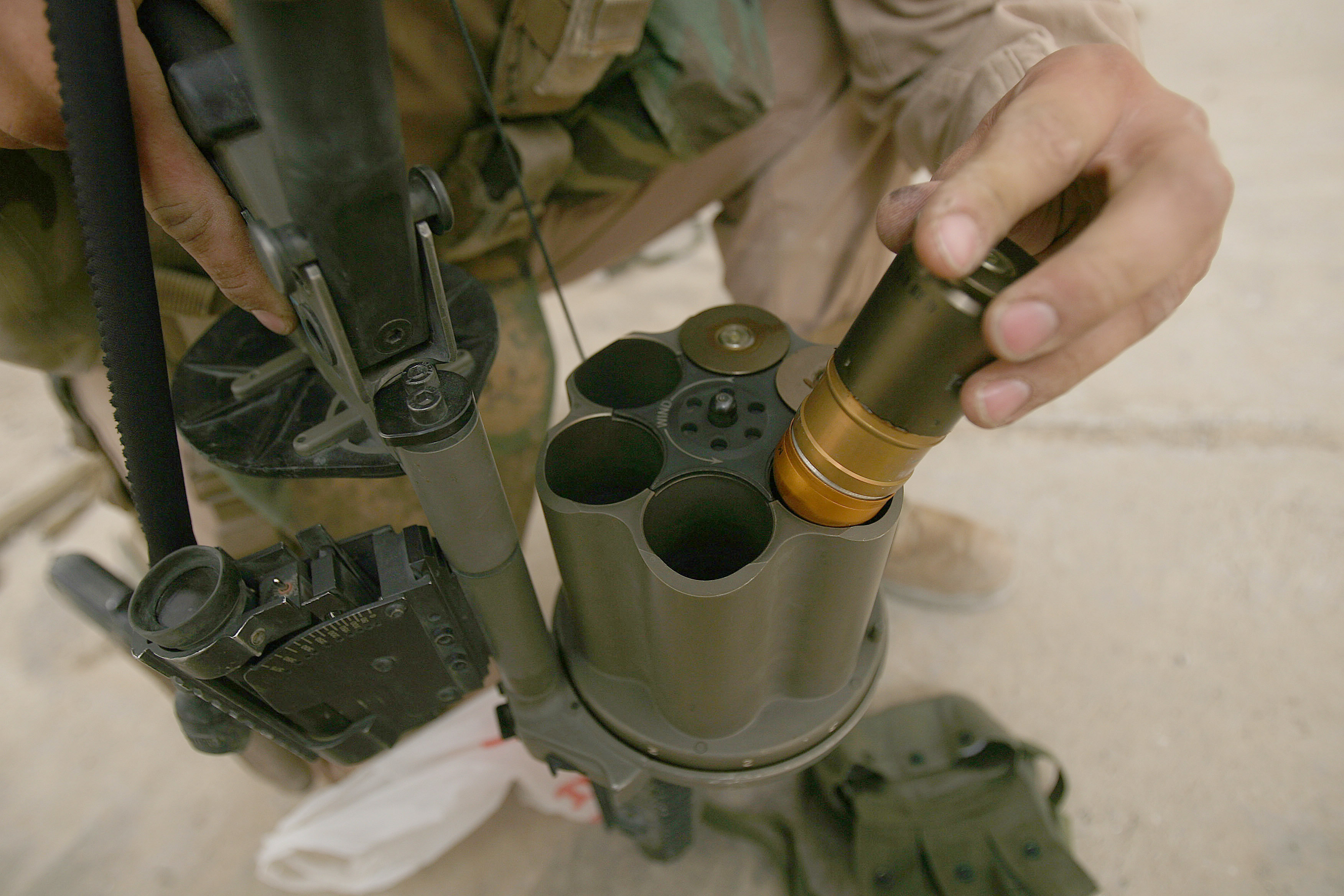
A U.S. Marine loading 40×46mm grenades into a Milkor MGL-140

Most grenade launchers are flexible in terms of the types of ammunition they can employ. In military use, the primary ammunition type for a grenade launcher is fragmentation rounds, with the most common grenade round in use by NATO the 40 mm fragmentation grenade, which is effective against a wide range of targets, including infantry and lightly armored vehicles. The large size of the grenade projectile relative to a bullet also allows for payloads requiring a substantial mass of chemicals, such as flares, incendiary rounds, gas grenades and smoke grenades. Law enforcement users generally employ grenade launchers in riot control operations to project obscuring smoke or tear gas; less-lethal crowd control munitions such as baton and sponge rounds also exist for such use.

Lethal rounds are usually fitted with an inertial fuzing system which arms the warhead after it has rotated a set number of times, in order to prevent the user from harming themselves if a grenade encounters a nearby obstruction.

Western launchers are primarily either the 37 mm flare caliber intended for civilian and law enforcement use, or the larger military 40 mm caliber. This is intended to prevent civilian-legal flare projectors being used to fire lethal military ammunition, since lethal rounds are not manufactured in 37mm caliber. The reverse is not true; a full range of less-lethal ammunition is available in 40 mm caliber, and an increasing number of law enforcement launchers not intended for the civilian market are chambered for 40×46mm rounds.

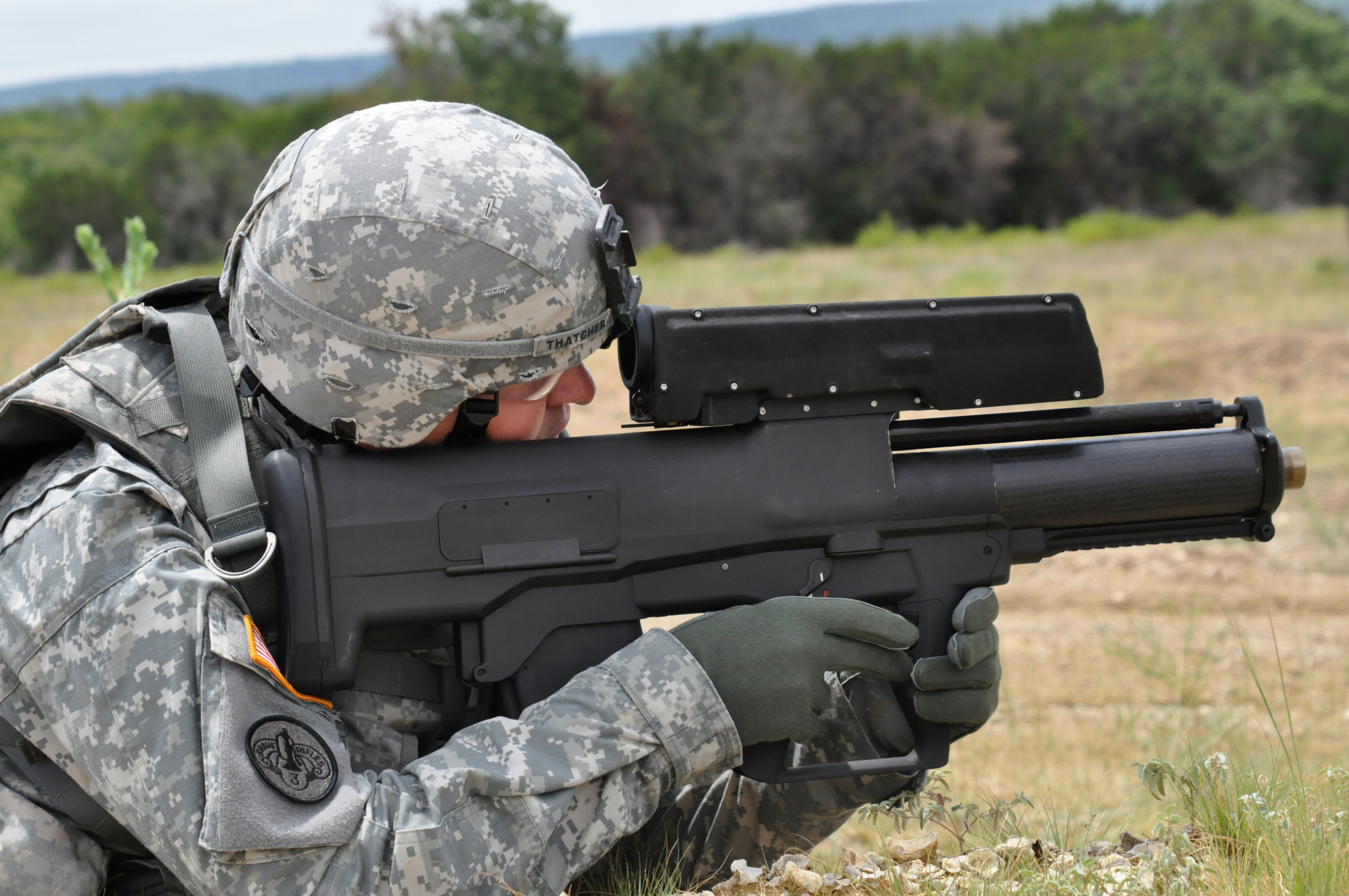
XM25 in use by a U.S. Army soldier

Recently militaries have paid great attention to the development of "smart" grenade systems with integrated sighting systems, which can be used as point-detonating rounds as normal, or fuzed to detonate in mid-air at a preset distance to engage targets in cover with their fragments. This ammunition was first developed as High Explosive Air Burst (HEAB) as part of the Small Arms Master Plan (SAMP) projects: the Objective Individual Combat Weapon (20×28mm and 25×40mm low-velocity) and Advanced Crew Served Weapon (25×59mm high-velocity) projects. The low-velocity round was to have been used by the XM25 CDTE. Following the failure of the SAMP weapon programs, the United States developed 40 mm grenades incorporating similar technology, including the 40×53mm MK285 Programmable Prefragmented High Explosive/Self-Destructible (PPHE/SD) round for the Mk 47 Striker AGL and more recently the SAGM round for 40×46mm underbarrel launchers, an airburst-only computerized grenade which does not require an integrated sighting system. Other countries have also produced grenades using similar technology, including South Korea for the S&T Daewoo K11, Australia during the Advanced Individual Combat Weapon program, and China for the ZH-05 grenade launcher module.

== Legality ==
=== United States ===
In the U.S., under the National Firearms Act of 1934, breech-loading firearms with a barrel diameter of greater than .50 inches (12.7 mm) and no practical sporting use are classified as Title II "destructive devices", with ownership heavily restricted and banned entirely in some states; in addition, each individual round of explosive ammunition for a grenade launcher is also classified as a destructive device and subject to the same restrictions. The state of California additionally considers rifles with integral rifle grenade launching devices as destructive devices in accordance with the definition of such in section 16460 of the California Penal Code. However, it is legal for civilians to own 37mm flare launchers which are not regulated as firearms, some of which are designed to have a cosmetic appearance similar to a grenade launcher and use certain types of ammunition, as the BATFE has ruled that unless such devices are possessed along with direct-fire ammunition such as pellet or beanbag rounds, they are not destructive devices. One result of this is that in American film productions, visually similar 37mm launchers are often substituted for 40mm weapons.

A "grenade launcher" or "grenade launcher mount" is usually included in the list of features defining an "assault weapon", though this is a legal definition which primarily affects firearms with flash hiders compatible with rifle grenades, since firearms that are designed specifically for launching explosive grenade rounds and their ammunition are already federally restricted as destructive devices. Several state assault weapon bans extend this to include under-barrel 37mm flare launchers on the list of banned features.

== See also ==
- Anti-materiel rifle
- Commando mortar
- Comparison of automatic grenade launchers
- List of grenade launchers
- Flare gun
- Kampfpistole
- Nahverteidigungswaffe
- Recoilless rifle
- Rocket-assisted projectile
- Rocket-propelled grenade
- Pike (munition)
- Raufoss Mk 211
