= Nebelwurfgerät =

Turret mounted launcher

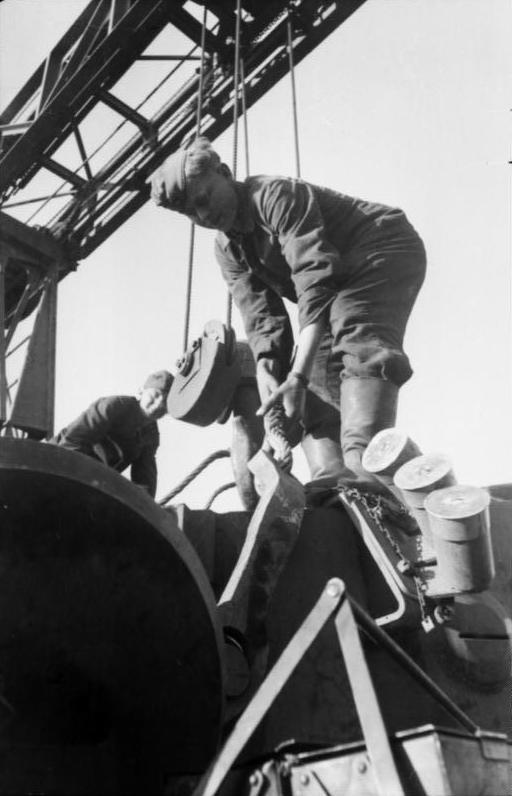
Close up of the Nebelwurfgerät mounted on a Tiger I turret.

The Nebelwurfgerät was a turret mounted launcher used to disperse the Schnellnebelkerze 39 smoke grenade. It was typically found on German tanks from 1942 through 1943.

== Operation ==
The Nebelwurfgerät was mounted in two sets of three, one on each forward side wall of the turret with each launcher being 9 centimetres (3.5 in) in calibre by 15 centimetres (6 in) in length. The uppermost launcher tubes were oriented forward and angled slightly outwards while the middle and lower tubes were set on a progressively lower elevation but increasing angle. Six smoke grenades were carried, one in each launcher tube. They were ejected out of each tube by Zündschraube C 23 primer which was electrically fired from six push-buttons labeled Nebelkerzen, these buttons being grouped in two sets of three, located in the turret to the left and right of the commander's position and forward of his cupola. No spare smoke grenades, primers or launcher tubes were carried.

Starting in August 1942, Wegmann prepared turrets for installation by welding mounting brackets to the turret sides and drilling holes for the wiring so that the troops could mount the device by themselves. Complete Nebelwurfgerät were mounted by the assembly plants starting in October 1942. During a reported action in February 1943, enemy small arms fire had inadvertently set off the smoke grenades inside their launcher tubes resulting in the temporary blinding and incapacitation of the tank crew. Because of this hazard, the Nebelwurfgerät was no longer mounted after June 1943 and this device was eventually supplanted by the Nahverteidigungswaffe.

== Gallery ==
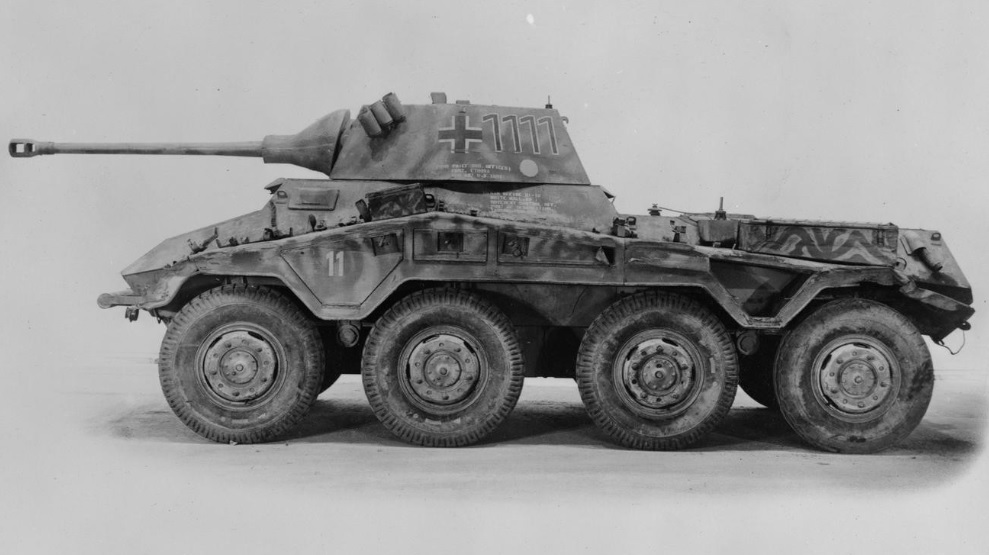
Sd.Kfz. 234 equipped with the Nebelwurfgerät

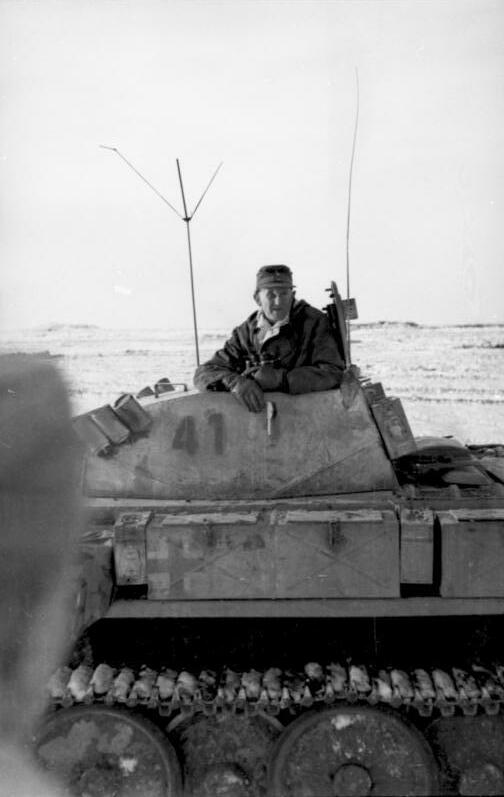
Panzer II "Luchs" tank equipped with the Nebelwurfgerät

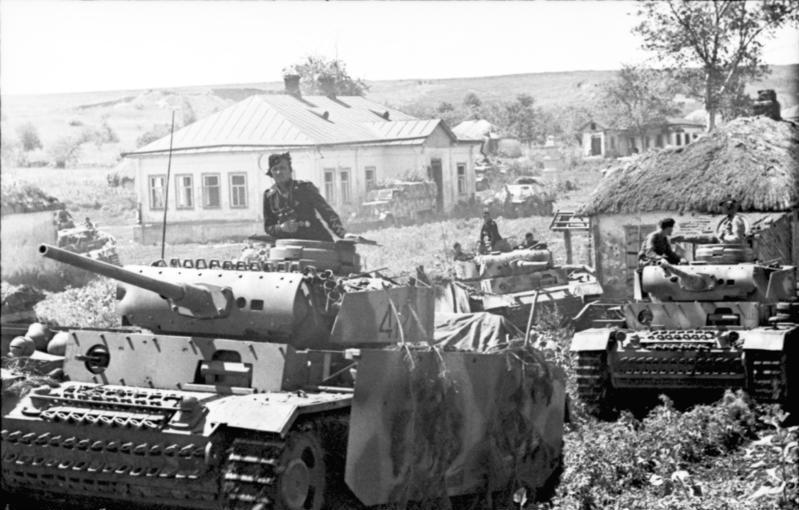
Panzer III tank equipped with the Nebelwurfgerät behind the Schürzen

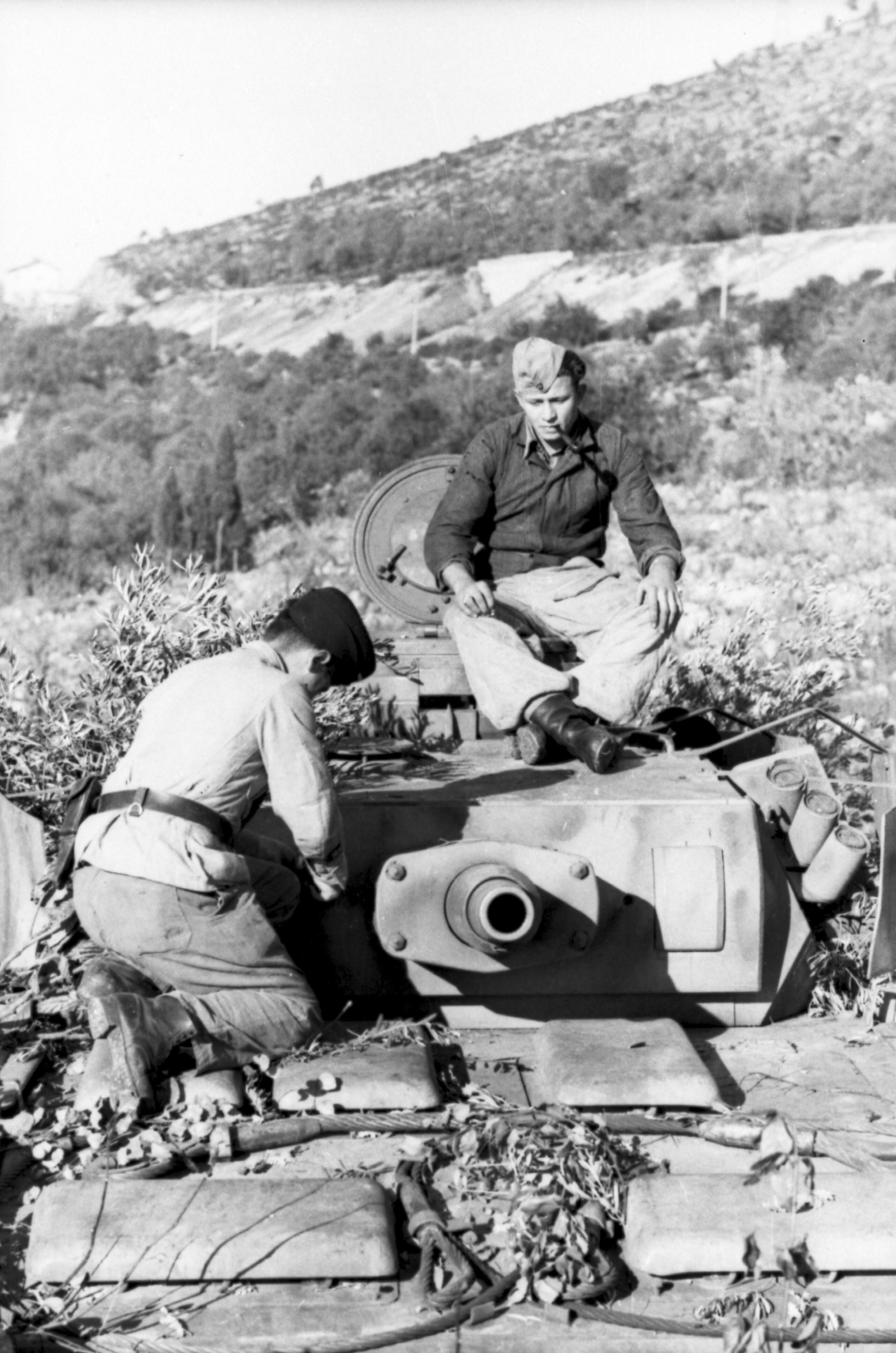
Panzer III tank equipped with the Nebelwurfgerät.

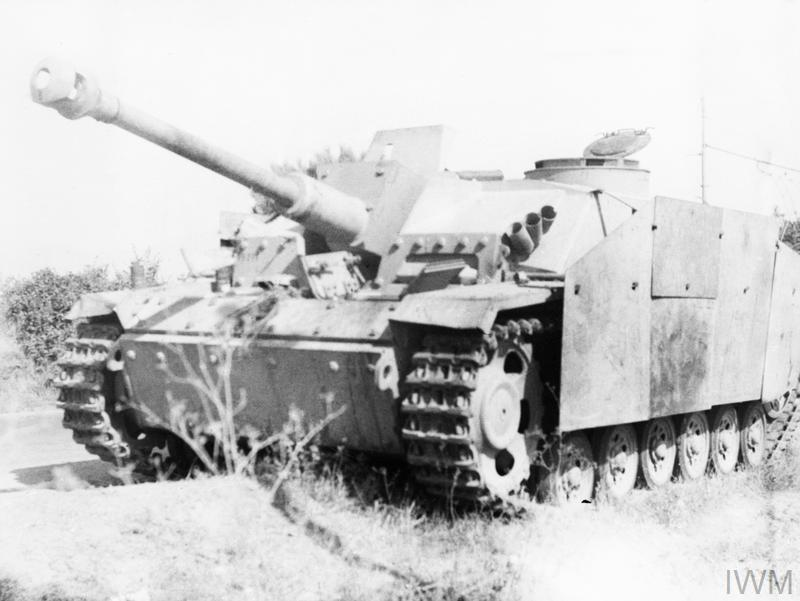
StuG III assault gun equipped with the Nebelwurfgerät

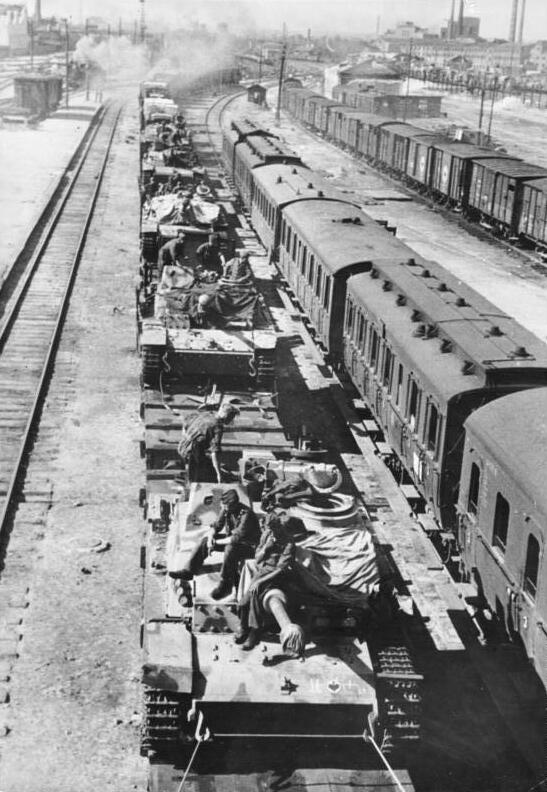
StuG III assault gun equipped with the Nebelwurfgerät

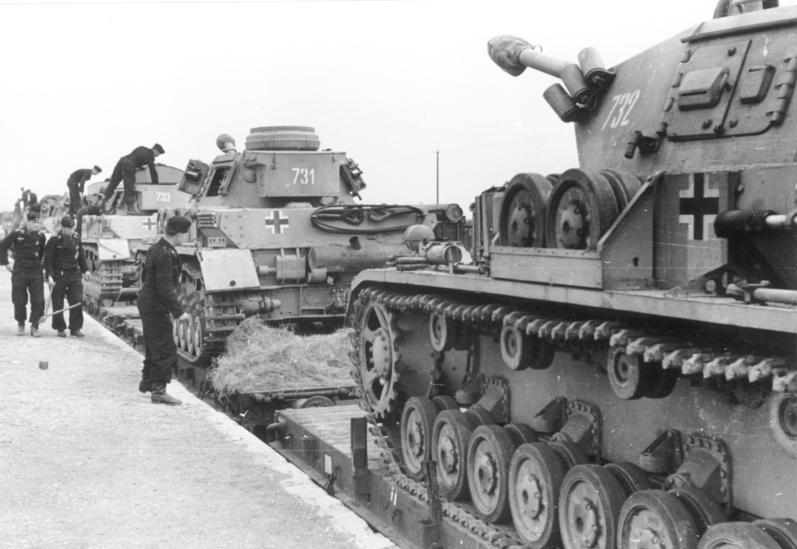
Panzer IV tank equipped with the Nebelwurfgerät

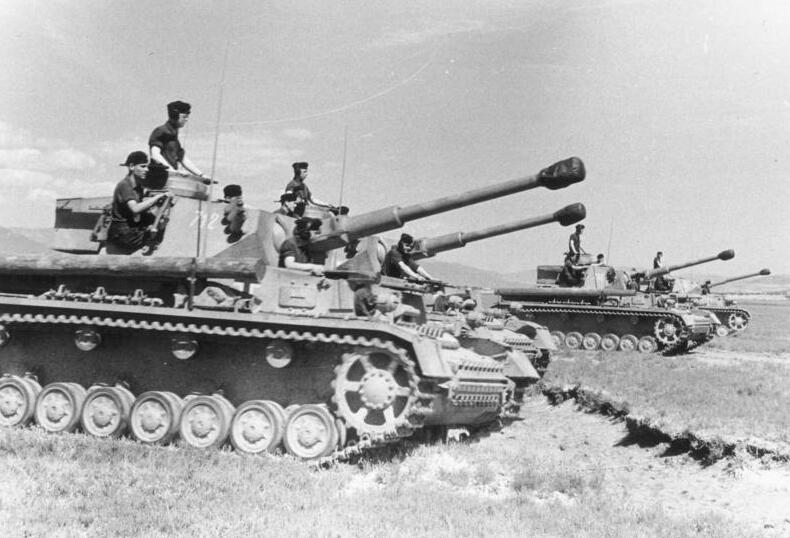
Panzer IV tank equipped with the Nebelwurfgerät

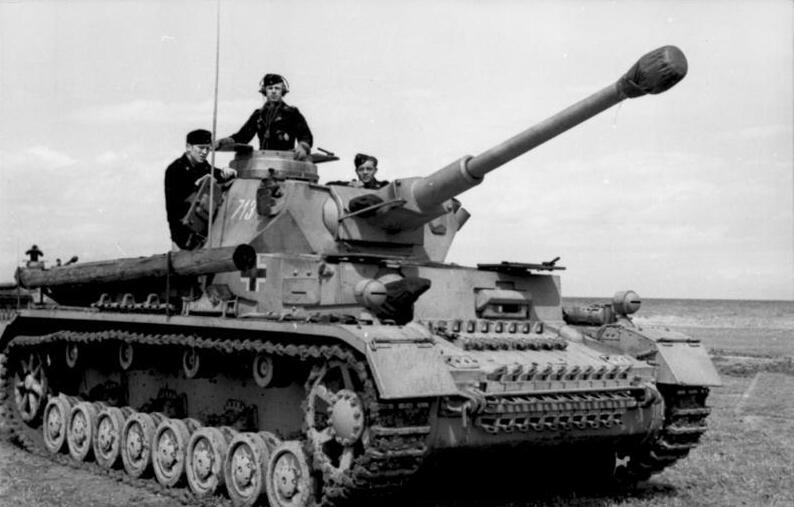
Panzer IV tank equipped with the Nebelwurfgerät

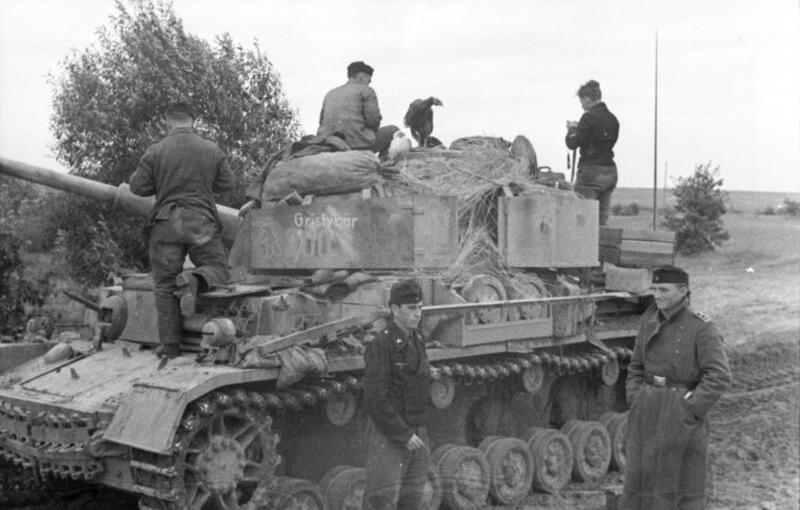
Panzer IV tank equipped with the Nebelwurfgerät behind the Schürzen.

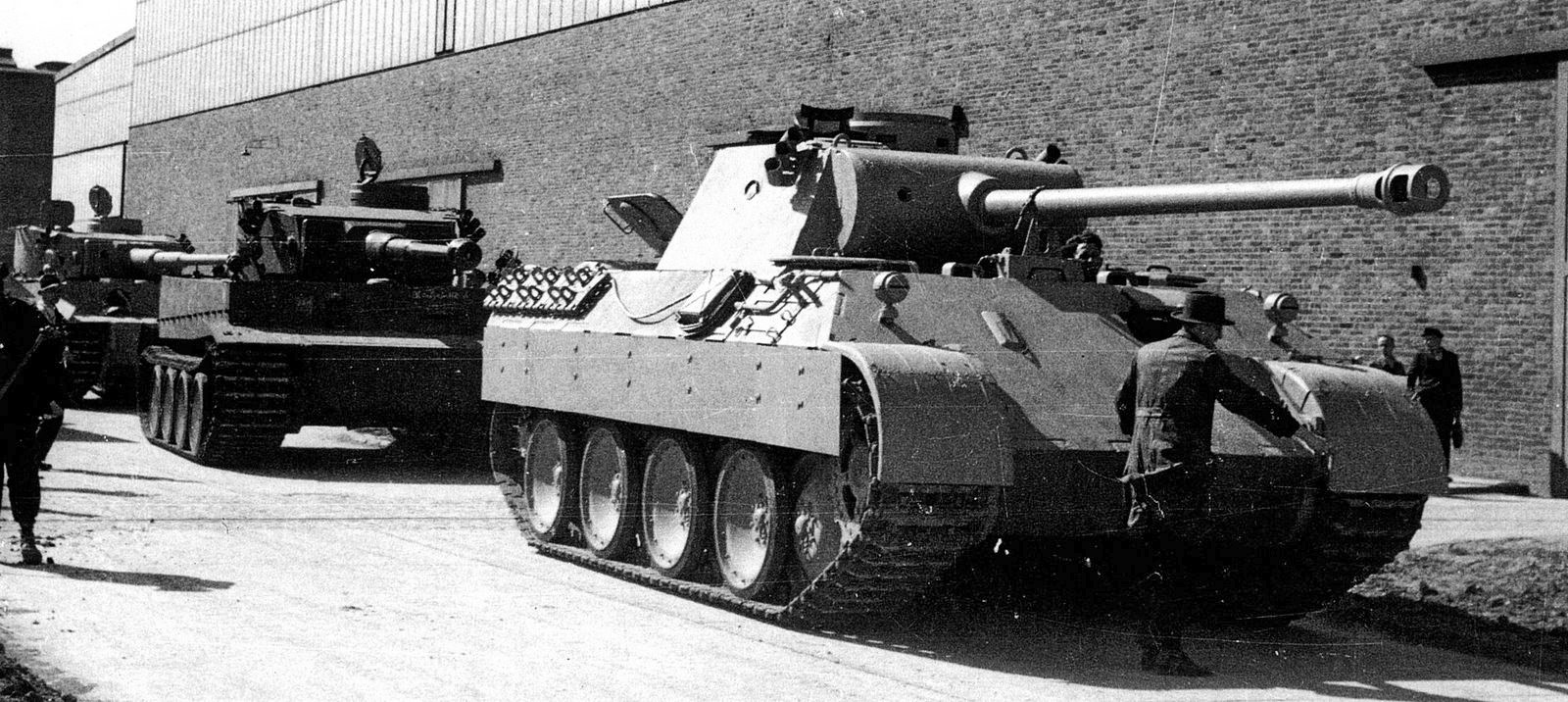
Panther & Tiger I tanks equipped with the Nebelwurfgerät.

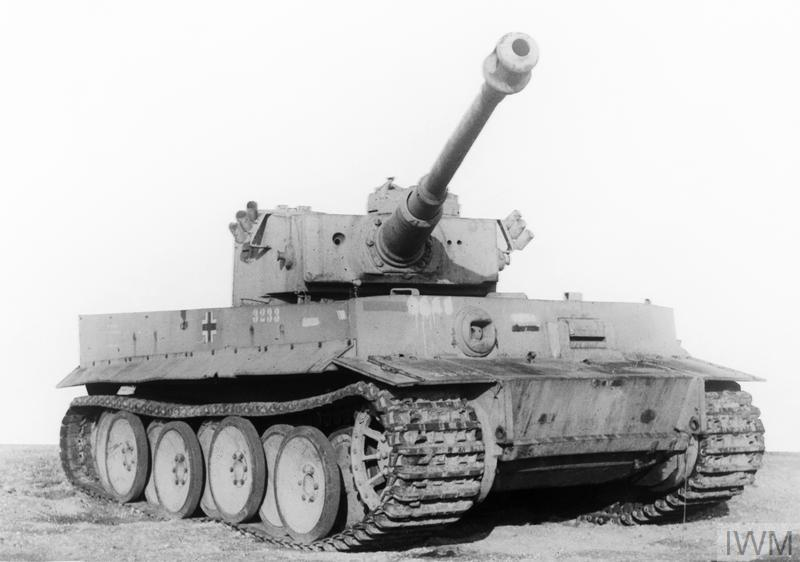
Tiger I tank equipped with the Nebelwurfgerät.

== See also ==
- Nebelkerzenabwurfvorrichtung
- Minenabwurfvorrichtung
- Nahverteidigungswaffe
