= Nahverteidigungswaffe =

German WWII tank-mounted grenade launcher

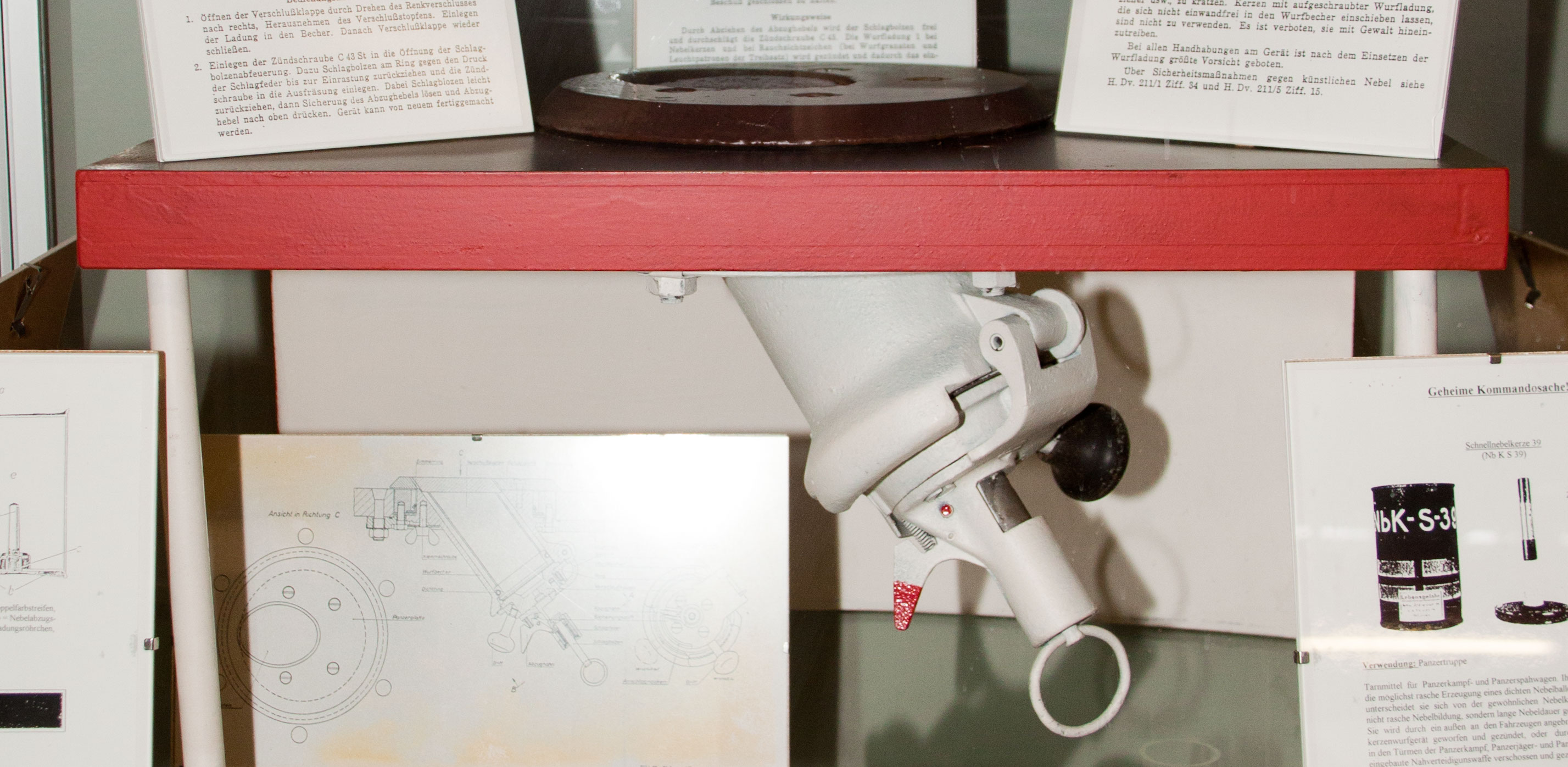
Close up of the Nahverteidigungswaffe at Panzermuseum Munster

The Nahverteidigungswaffe was a roof mounted, breech-loaded, single shot, multi-purpose, 360° rotating grenade launcher that could fire a variety of ammunition. It was typically found on German tanks such as the Panzer IV, Panther I, Tiger I, and Tiger II from 1944 until the end of the war and was intended to replace three previous devices: the Nebelwurfgerät, the Minenabwurfvorrichtung, and pistol ports.

== Operation ==
The Nahverteidigungswaffe was a simple breech-loaded launcher tube oriented at a 50° angle and fitted in a traversable mounting on the turret roof. Unlike the previous externally mounted launchers, it was not exposed to enemy fire, being reloaded from within the vehicle through a hinged breech.

The Nahverteidigungswaffe was designed to mate with the standard 26 millimetres (1 in) Kampfpistole flare gun and could be sealed by an armored plug when not in use. Aiming was by periscopes located on the turret and cupola.

== Ammunition ==
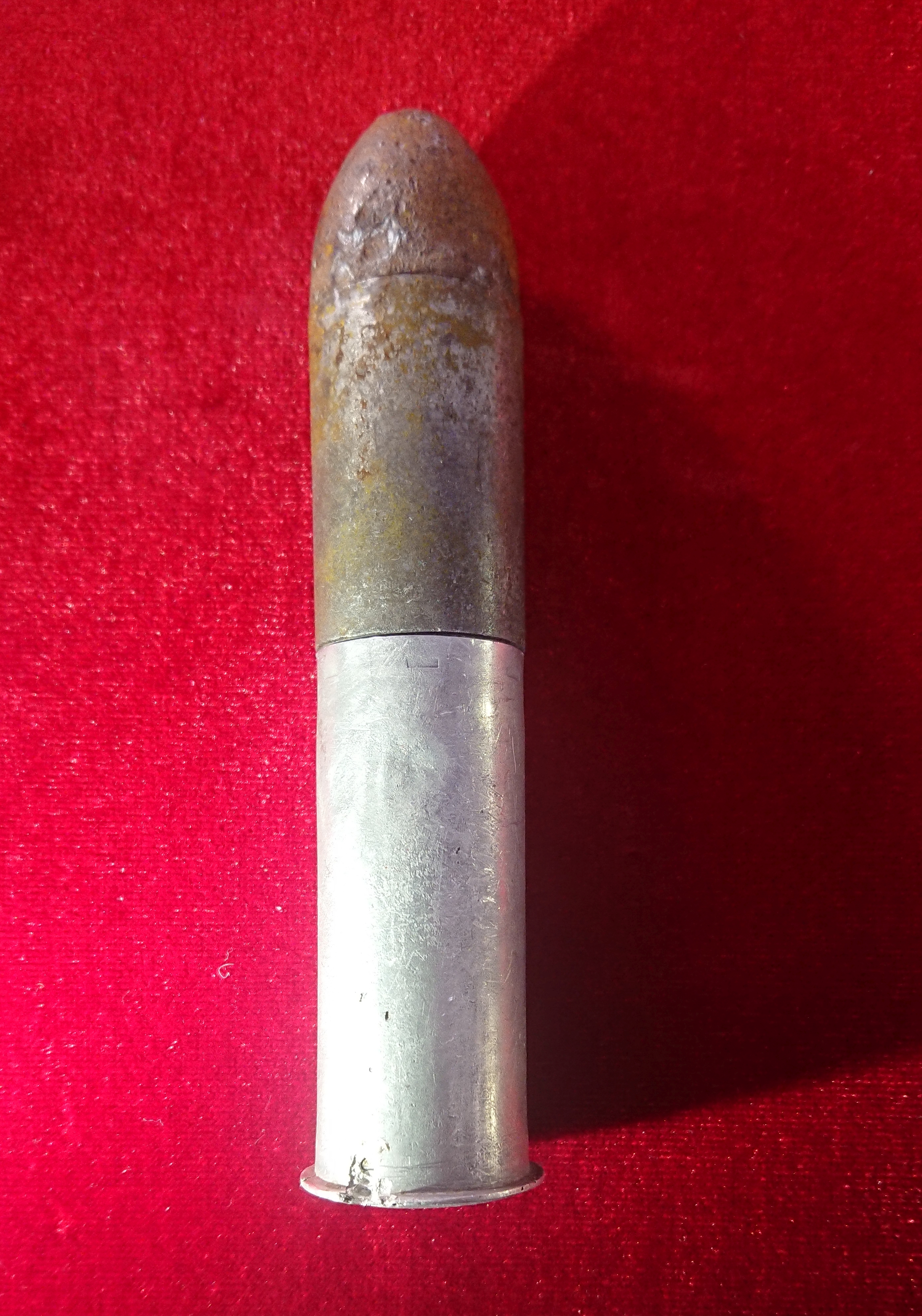
326 Lp

The device could fire the following ammunition:

- Schnellnebelkerze 39 smoke grenade for concealment
- Rauchsichtzeichen Orange 350 smoke signal for identification to friendly aircraft
- Leuchtgeschoss R flare
- Sprenggranatpatrone 326 Lp anti-personnel explosive to defend the vehicle against infantry attack

The Sprenggranatpatrone 326 Lp had a range of 7 to 10 meters (23 to 33 ft) with a blast point of 0.5 to 2 meters (2 to 7 ft) above the ground. It splintered to a circumferential distance of 100 meters (328 ft) after an initial delay time of one second. All turret hatches and openings were to be closed when this round was fired.

== Deployment ==
The Nahverteidigungswaffe was first mounted in March 1944 on the Panther tank. It was equipped on a variety of late-war vehicles, including the Sturmtiger and the Maus tank.

== Gallery ==
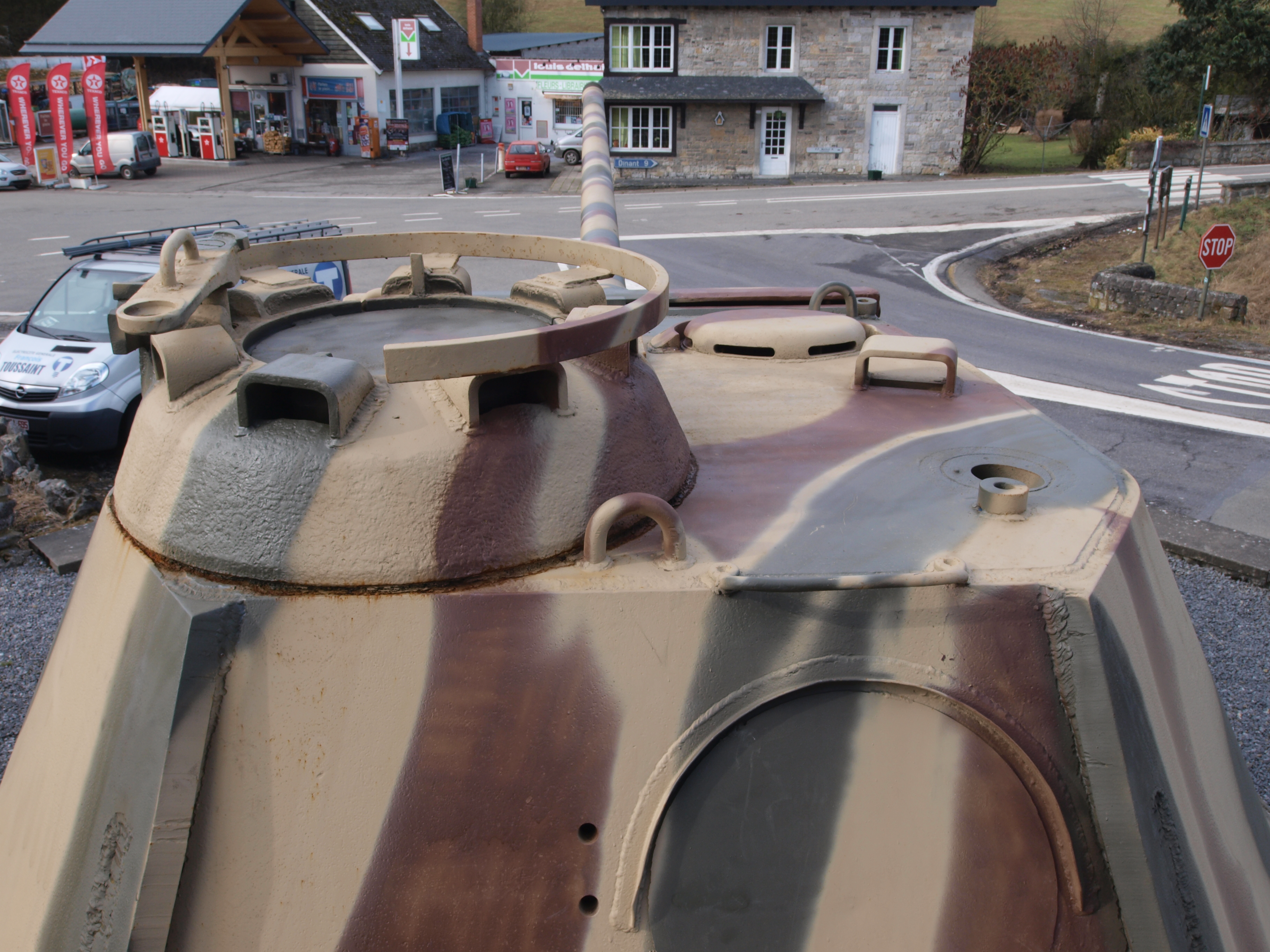
Panther I tank equipped with the Nahverteidigungswaffe. Roof of the turret, bottom right.

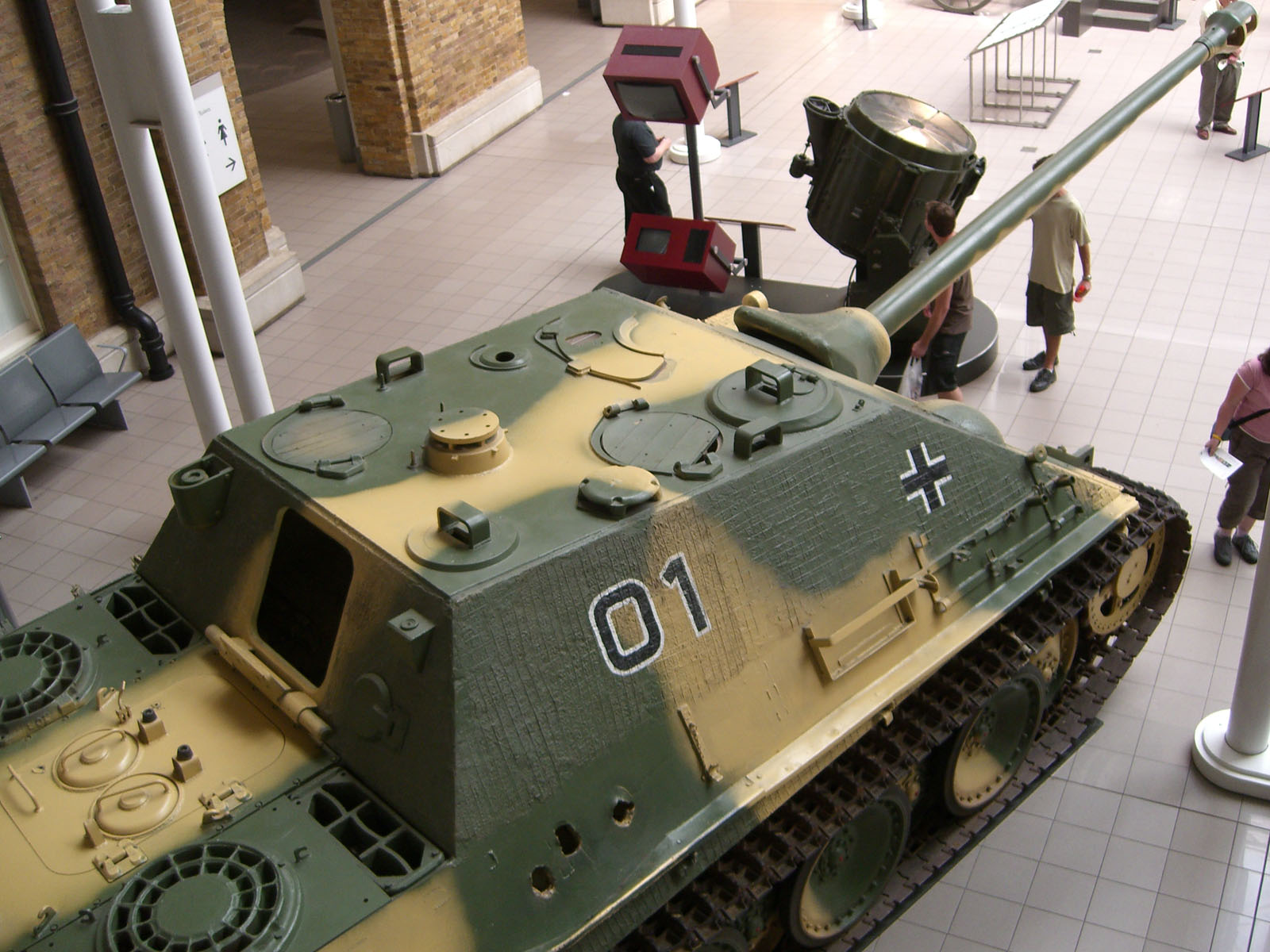
Jagdpanther equipped with the Nahverteidigungswaffe on the upper left side of the roof. Center left side of the roof.

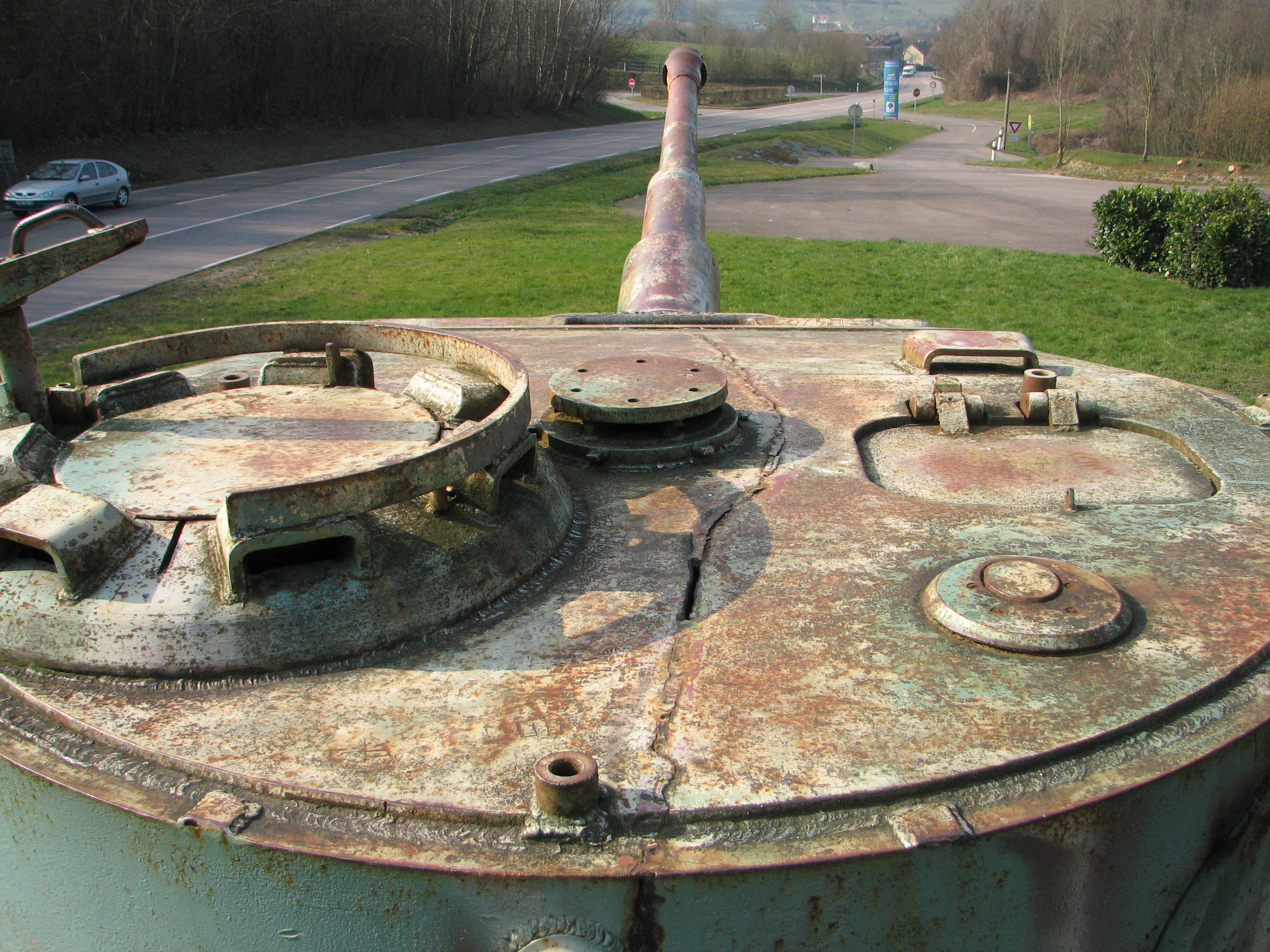
The Nahverteidigungswaffe with armored plug as seen on a Tiger I tank. Roof of the turret, bottom right.

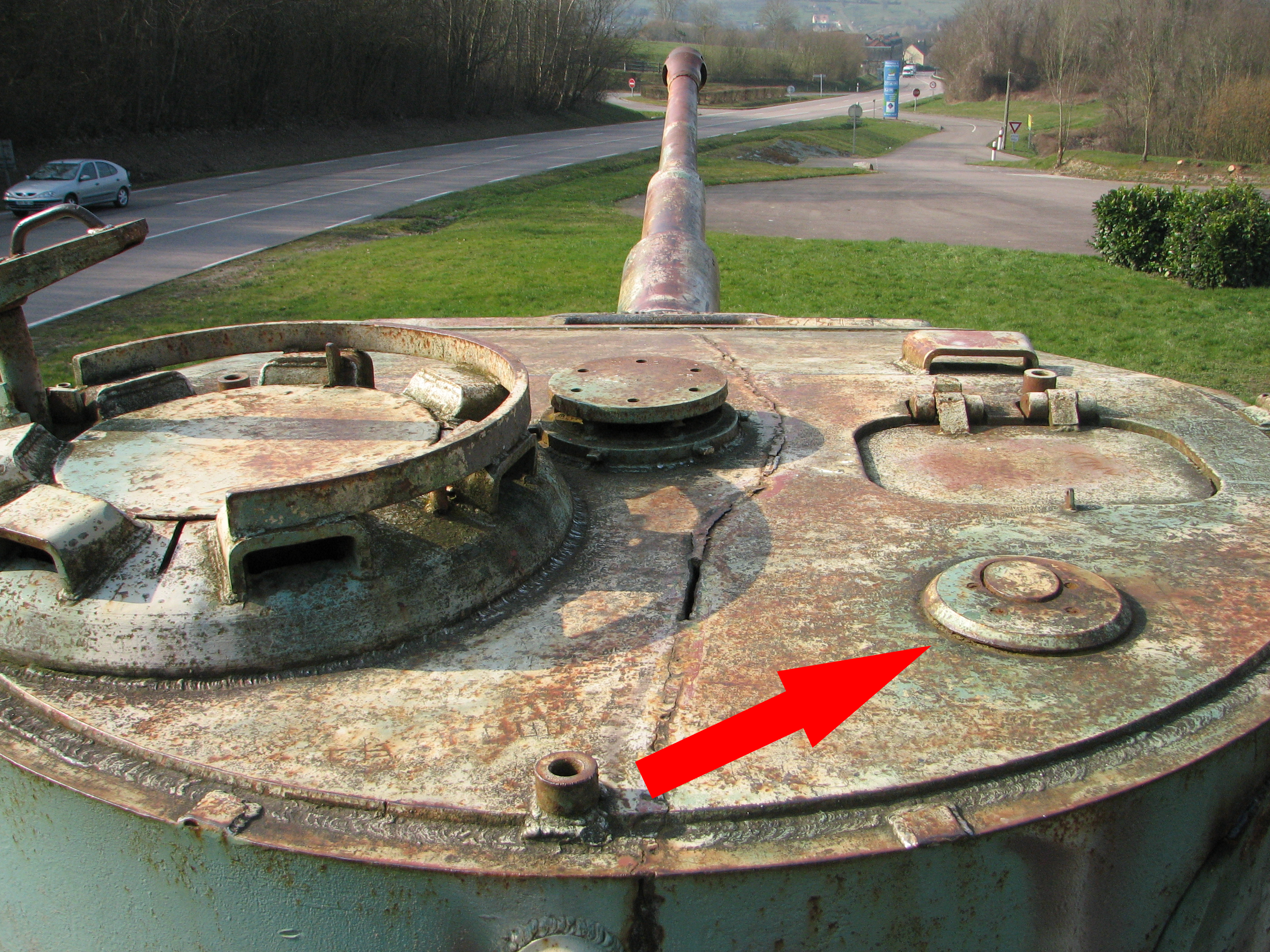
The Nahverteidigungswaffe with armored plug as seen on a Tiger I tank. Highlighted.

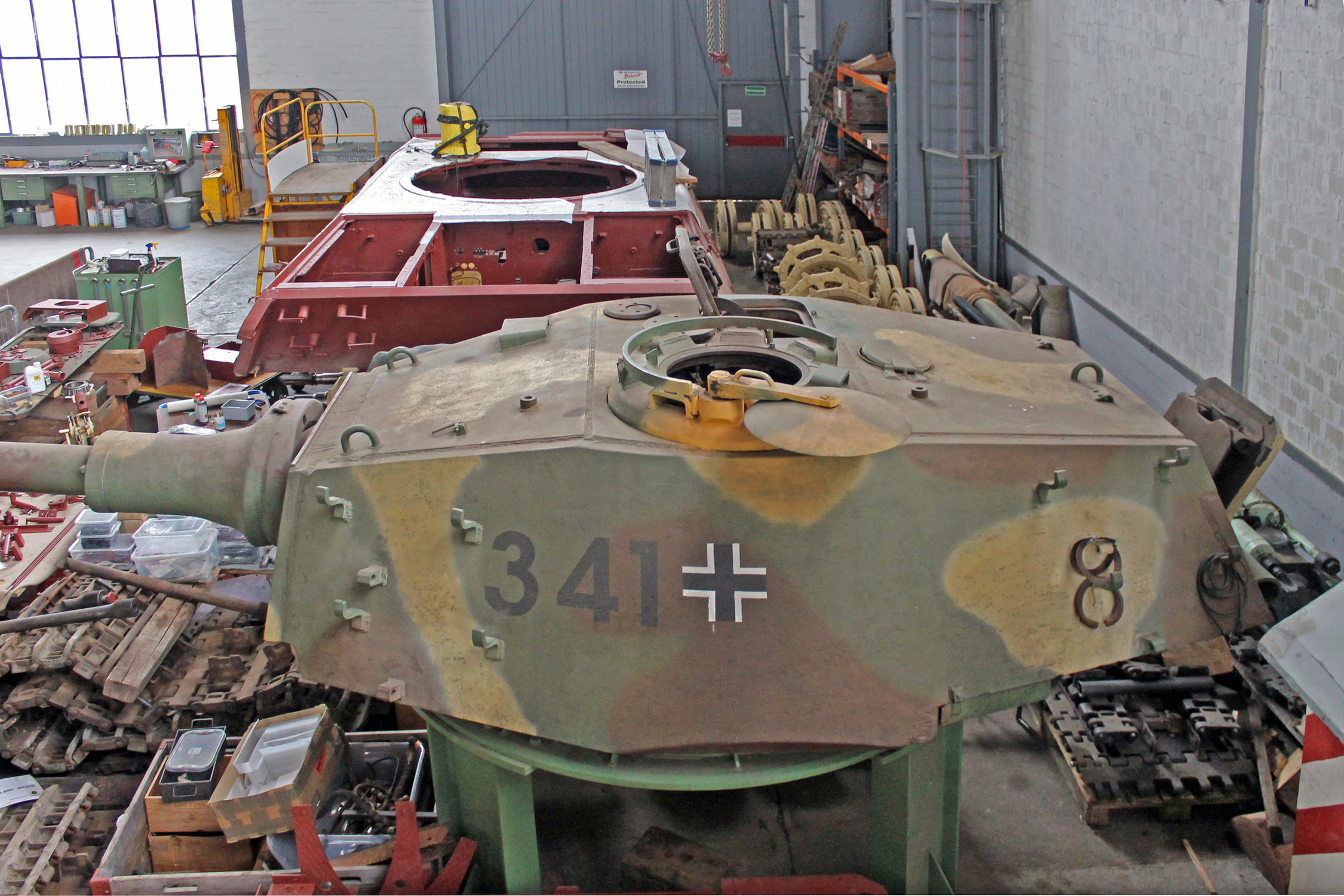
Tiger II tank equipped with the Nahverteidigungswaffe on the right side of the roof.

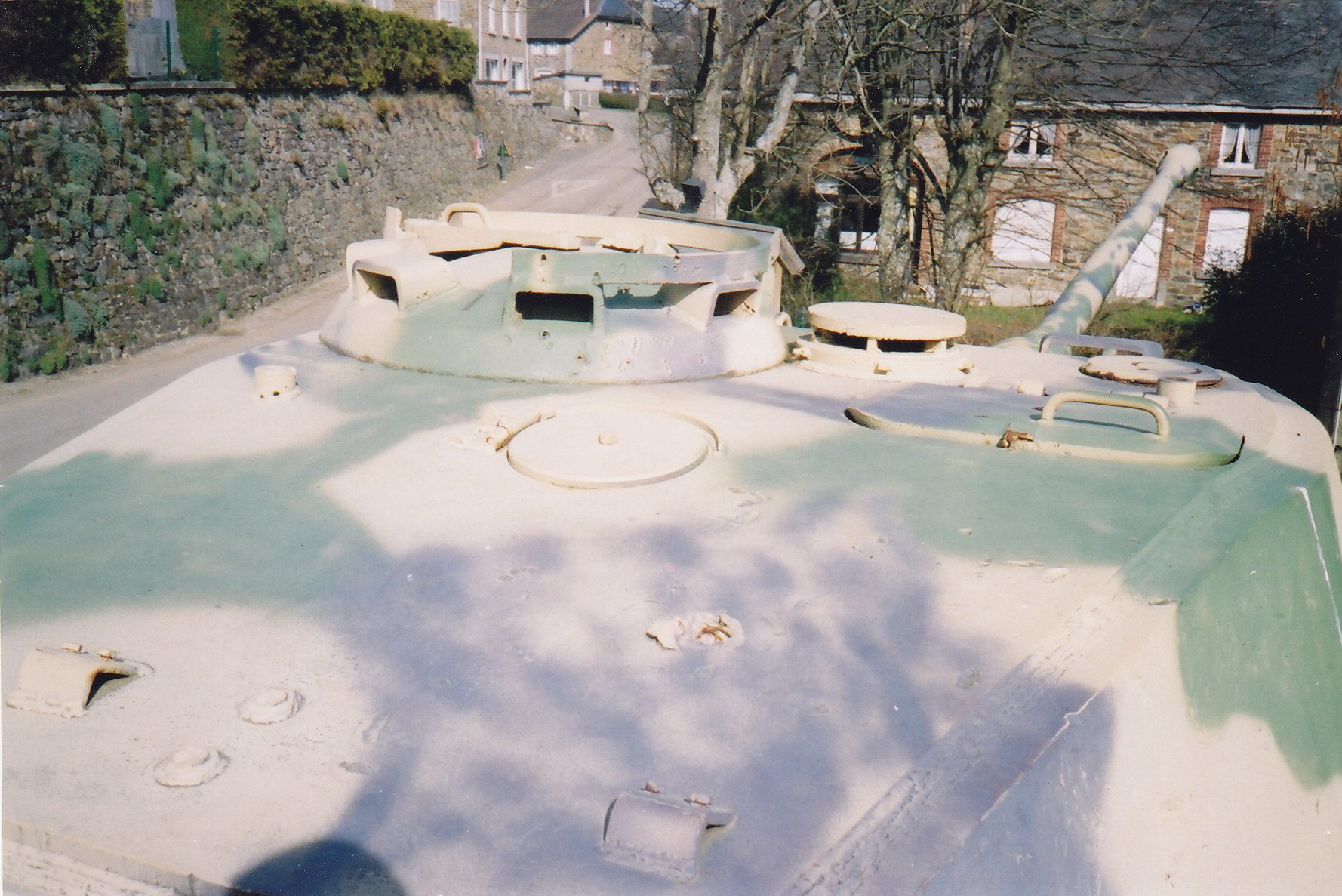
Tiger II tank equipped with the Nahverteidigungswaffe. Roof of the turret, top right.

== See also ==
- Nebelkerzenabwurfvorrichtung
- Nebelwurfgerät
- Minenabwurfvorrichtung
- Grenade discharger
