= Minenabwurfvorrichtung =

German WWII anti-personnel mine launcher

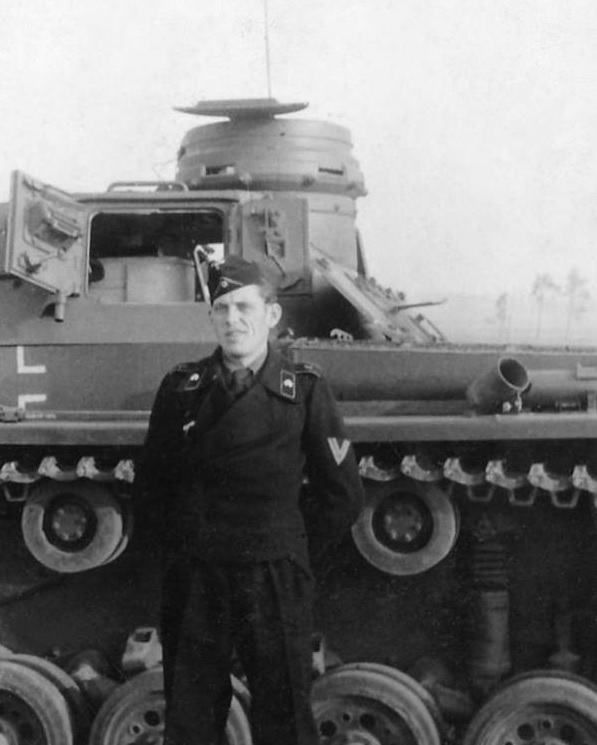
Close up of the Minenabwurfvorrichtung mounted on a Panzer III tank.

The Minenabwurfvorrichtung was an anti-personnel mine launcher used to disperse S-Mines. It was typically found on German tanks such as the Panzer III and Tiger I from 1942 through 1943.

== Operation ==
The Minenabwurfvorrichtung was a simple device consisting of a small steel tube oriented at a 50° angle mounted to the hull roof or track guards of the tank. The tube contained a modified version of the infantry S-mine equipped with the Glühzünder 28 fuze which allowed it to be electrically fired from the inside of the vehicle using a small control panel labeled Minenabwurfschalter that was mounted on the engine firewall. The mine itself consisted of a round projectile 130 millimetres (5 in) deep by 122 millimetres (5 in) wide and contained about 360 steel balls. The projectile was fired about 0.9 to 1.5 meters (3 to 5 ft) into the air, where it would explode, scattering the steel balls in all directions. Starting in June 1942, up to six launchers were mounted on the track guards of an unknown number of Panzerkampfwagen III Ausführung L tanks and were issued for troop testing to the 13th Panzer Division. The device was subsequently adopted as standard equipment on new production Tiger I tanks during January through October 1943. On the standard Tiger I, five launchers (four on Panzerbefehlswagen) were mounted around the periphery of the hull roof, one at each corner and one halfway along the left hull side. As future plans were being made to install the 360° traversable Nahverteidigungswaffe, fired from the interior of the turret, the Minenabwurfvorrichtung was discontinued in early October 1943 after only a few hundred Tiger Is had been equipped with them.

== Gallery ==
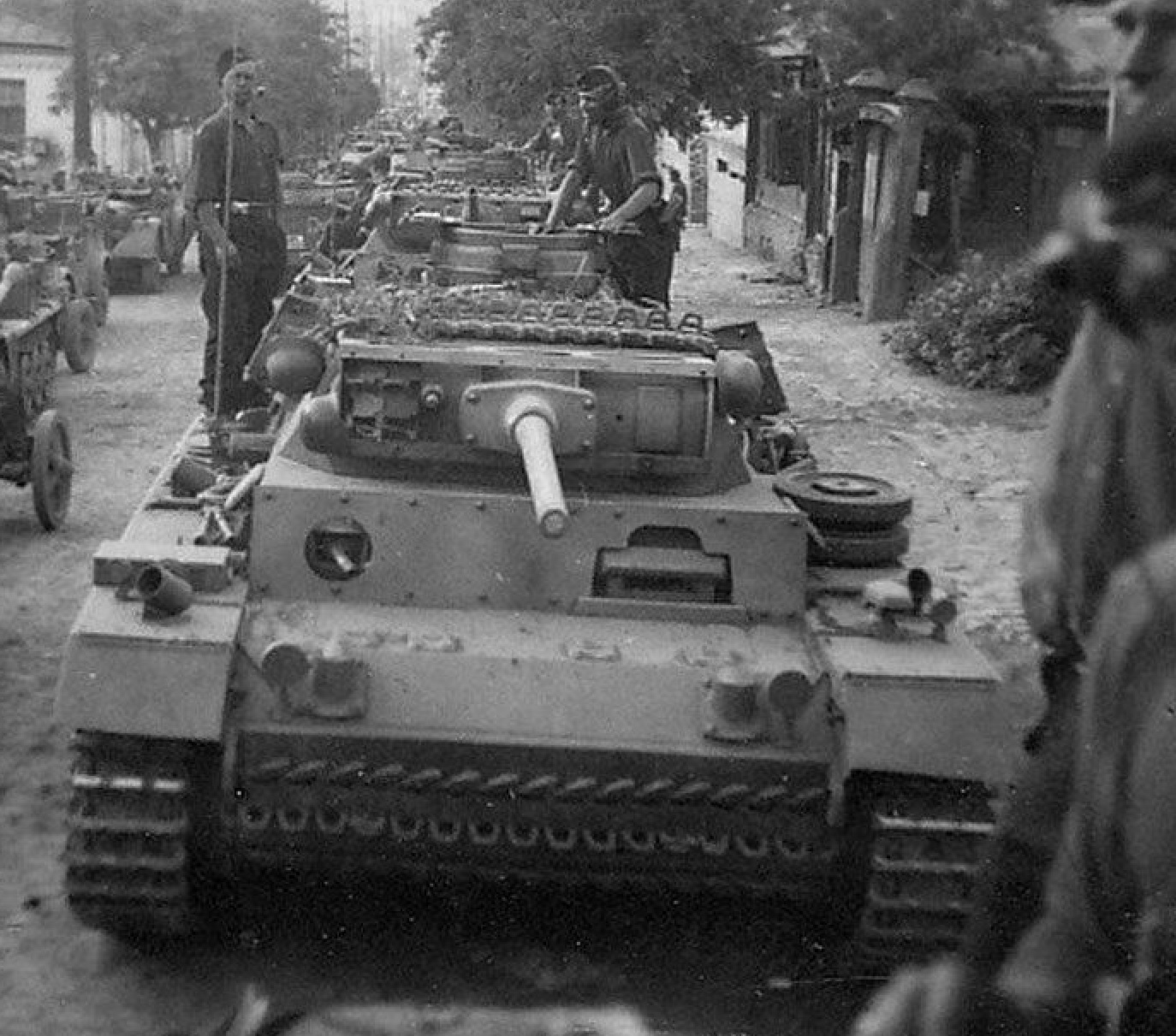
Panzer III tank equipped with the Minenabwurfvorrichtung

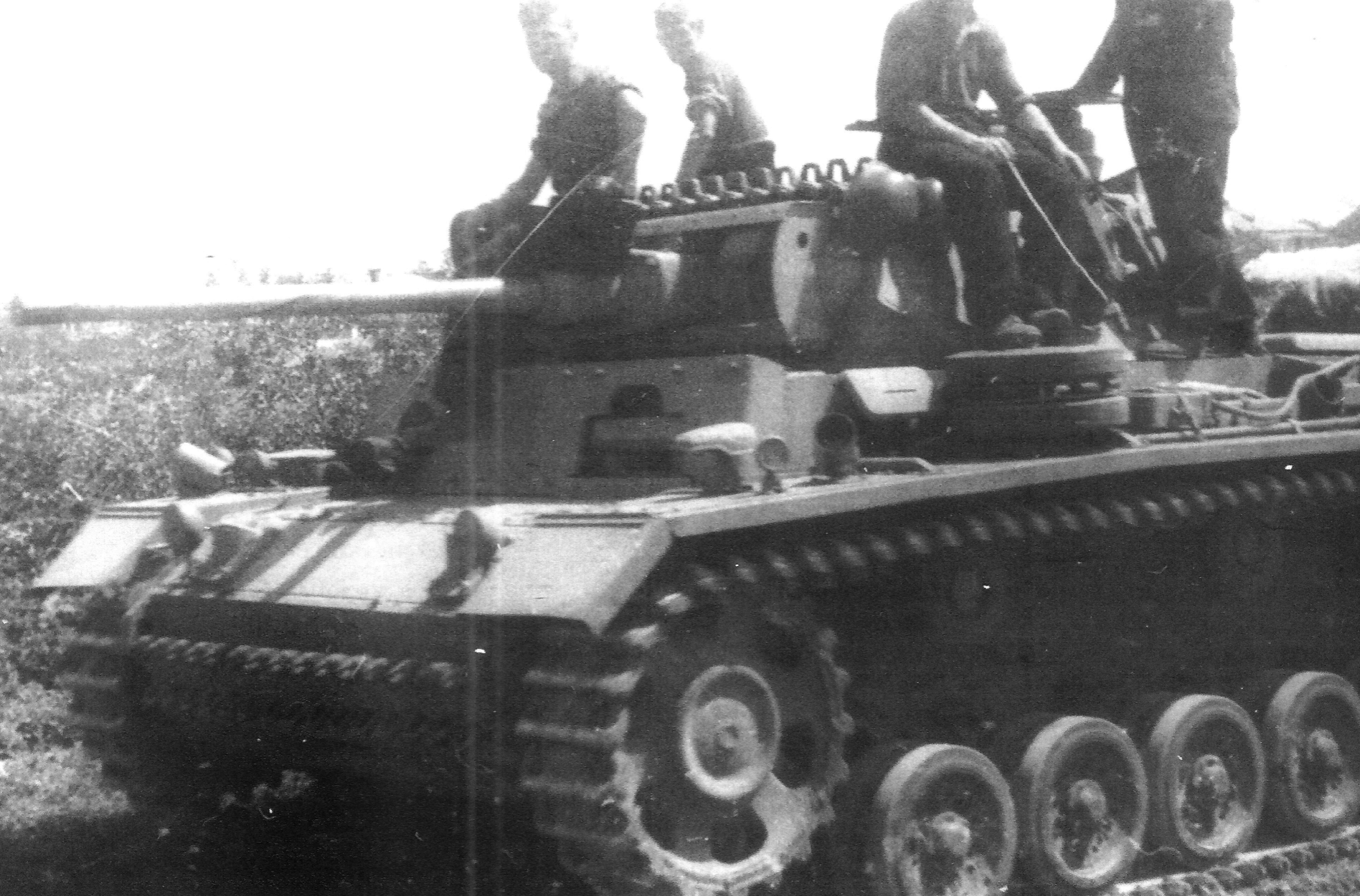
Panzer III tank equipped with the Minenabwurfvorrichtung

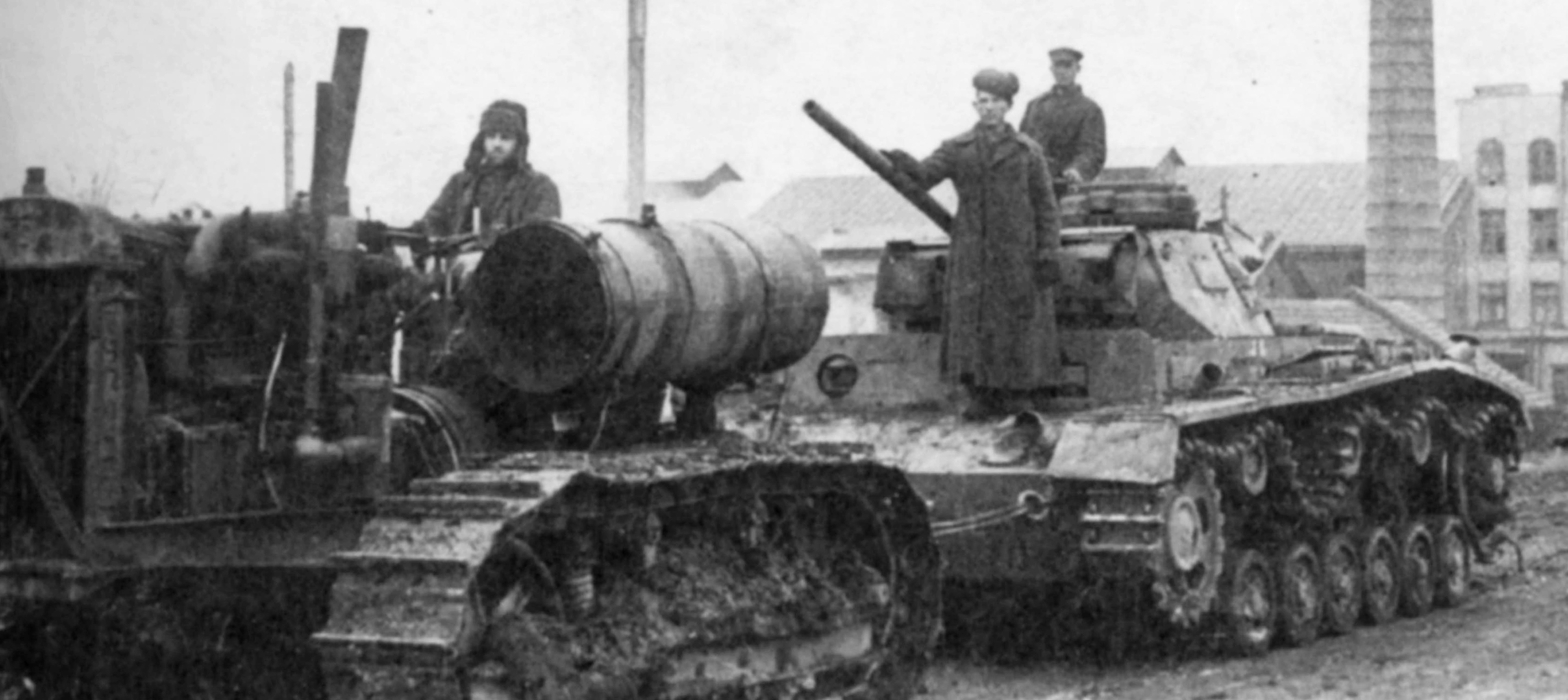
Captured Panzer III tank equipped with the Minenabwurfvorrichtung

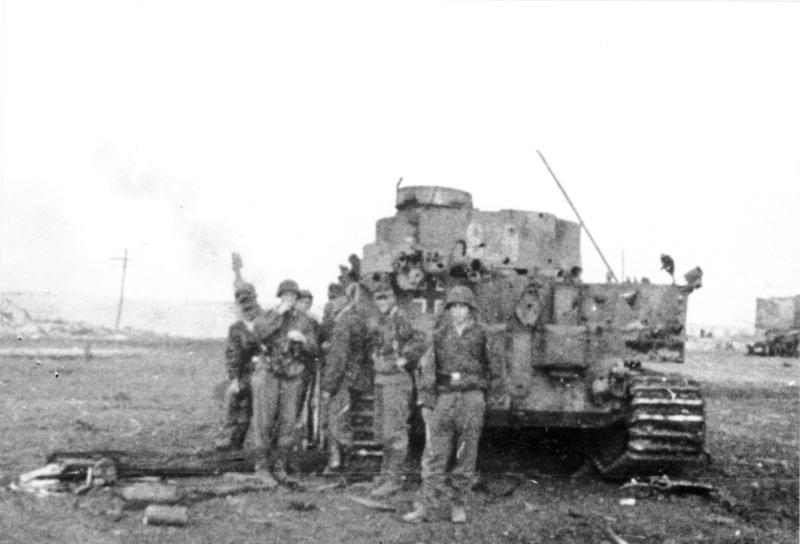
Tiger I tank equipped with the Minenabwurfvorrichtung

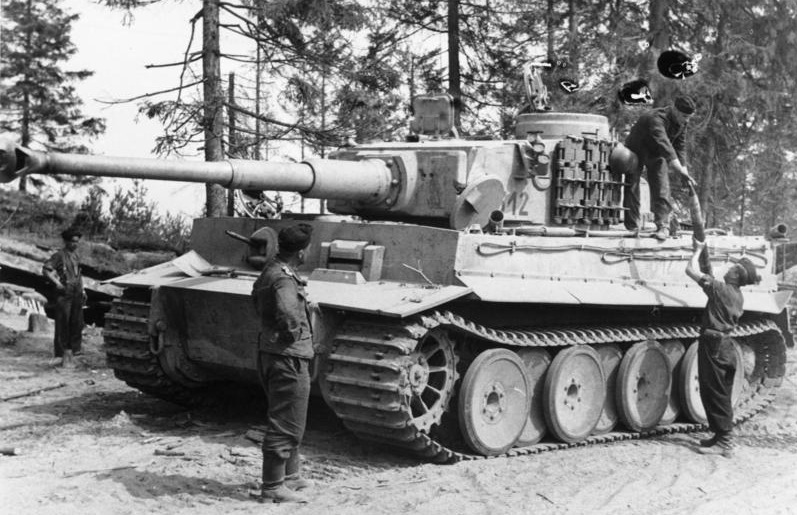
Tiger I tank equipped with the Minenabwurfvorrichtung

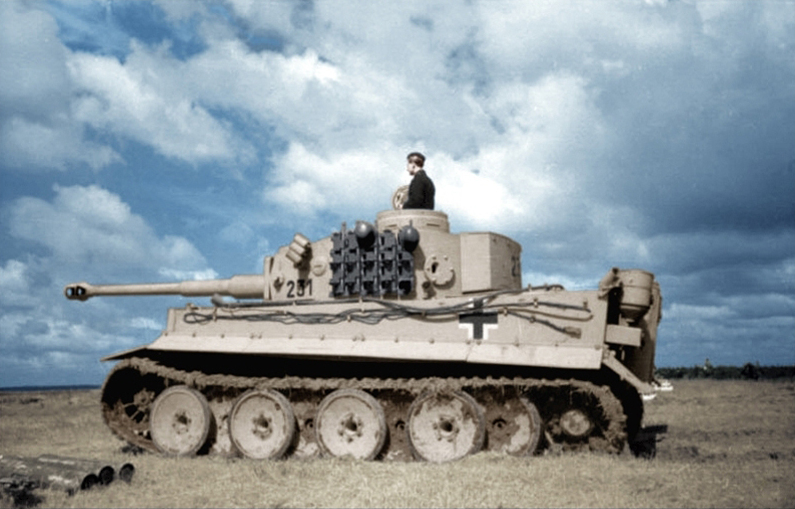
Tiger I tank equipped with the Minenabwurfvorrichtung

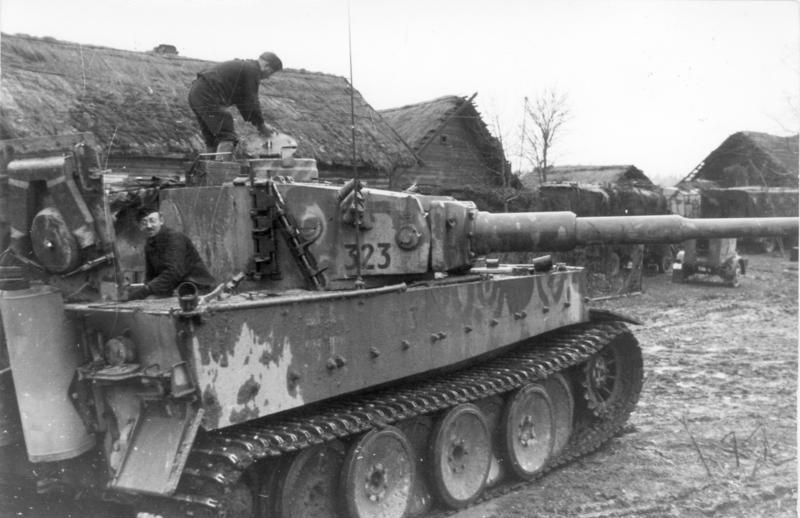
Tiger I tank equipped with the Minenabwurfvorrichtung

== See also ==
- S-Mine
- Nebelkerzenabwurfvorrichtung
- Nebelwurfgerät
- Nahverteidigungswaffe
