= Nebelkerzenabwurfvorrichtung =

German smoke grenade dispenser, WW2

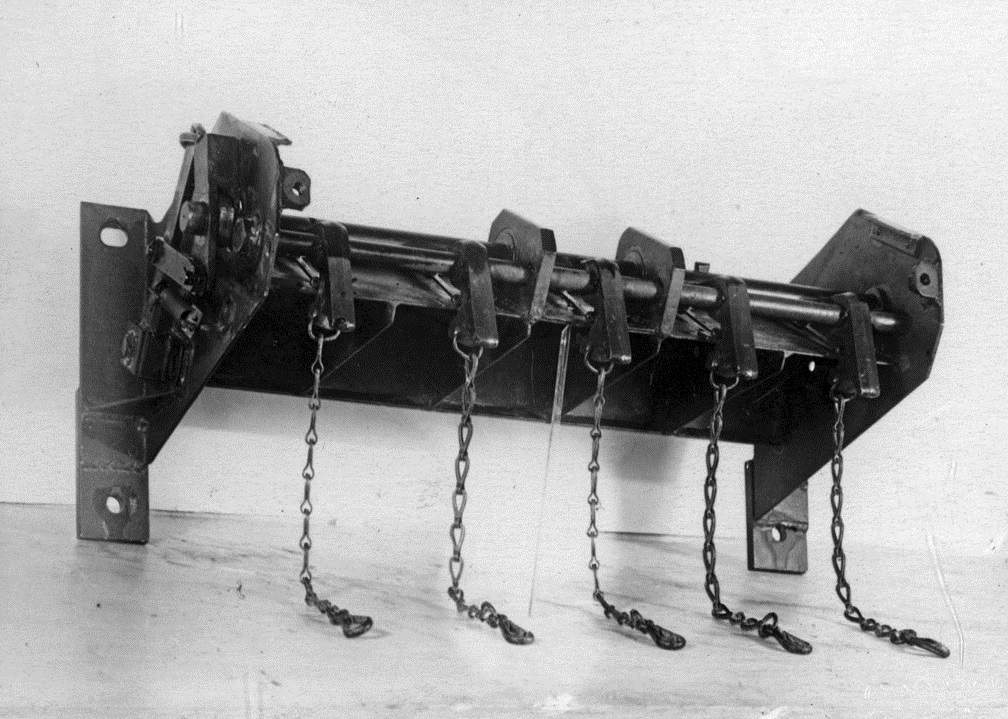
Close up of the Nebelkerzenabwurfvorrichtung.

The Nebelkerzenabwurfvorrichtung (literally “fog-candle-dropping-device,” i.e. smoke grenade dispenser, abbreviated N.K.A.V.) was a rear mounted grenade dispenser used to disperse the Schnellnebelkerze 39 smoke grenade. It was typically found on German tanks from 1939 through 1942.

== Operation ==
The device carried five smoke grenades, each grenade being held in position by spring loaded catches. The vehicle commander released the grenades one at a time by wire control which operated a ratchet coupled to a camshaft.

Each pull of the control wire rotated the camshaft one fifth of a turn, releasing a smoke grenade, the pin of which was drawn out by a fixed chain, and the ratchet was returned to its original position by a second spring. Five pulls on the control wire would release all five smoke grenades in succession, enabling the vehicle to reverse out of sight into its own smoke screen with the grenades discharging smoke for about 100 to 200 seconds. Later examples of the Nebelkerzenabwurfvorrichtung were fully enclosed in an armored box (N.K.A.V. mit Schutzmantel). The Nebelkerzenabwurfvorrichtung was discontinued beginning in April 1942 because it had not proven to be effective, the main disadvantage being that the resulting smoke screen built up behind the vehicle. It was succeeded by the turret mounted Nebelwurfgerät launcher.

== Gallery ==
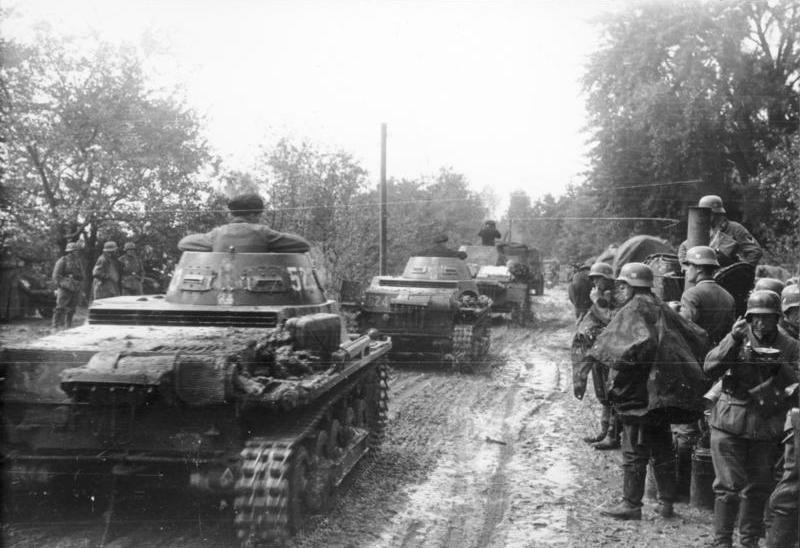
Panzer I tank equipped with the N.K.A.V.

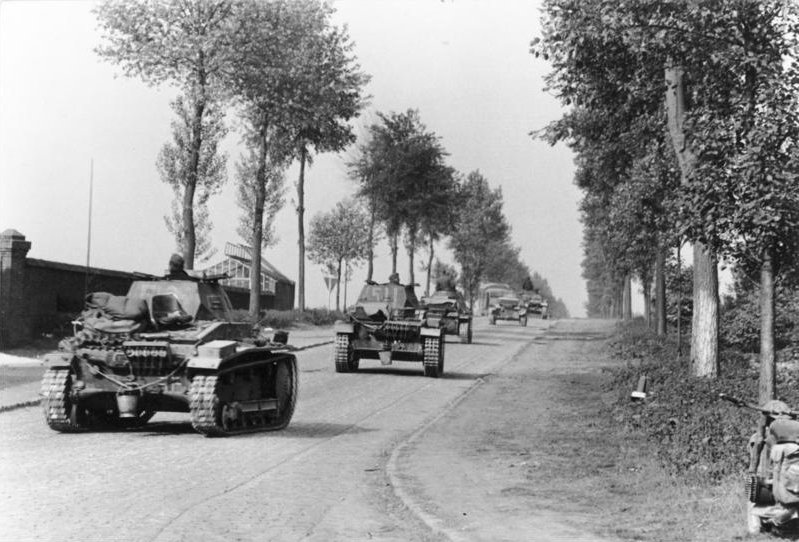
Panzer II tank equipped with the N.K.A.V.

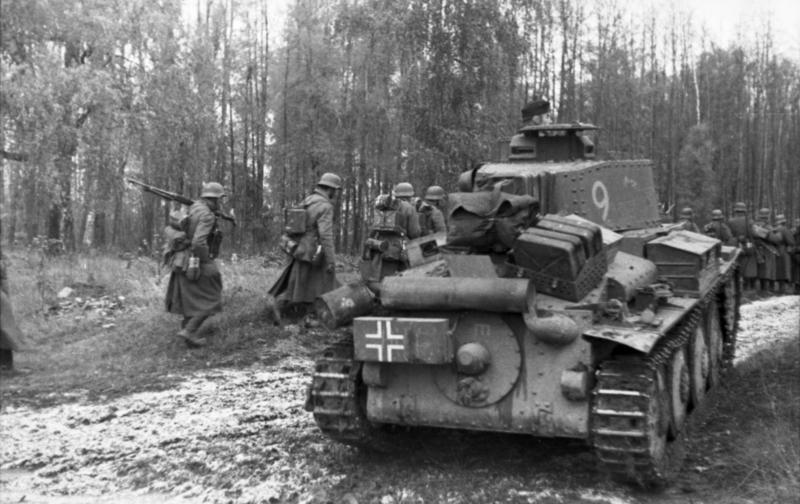
Panzer 38(t) tank with an armored N.K.A.V. mounted below the muffler and painted with a Balkenkreuz.

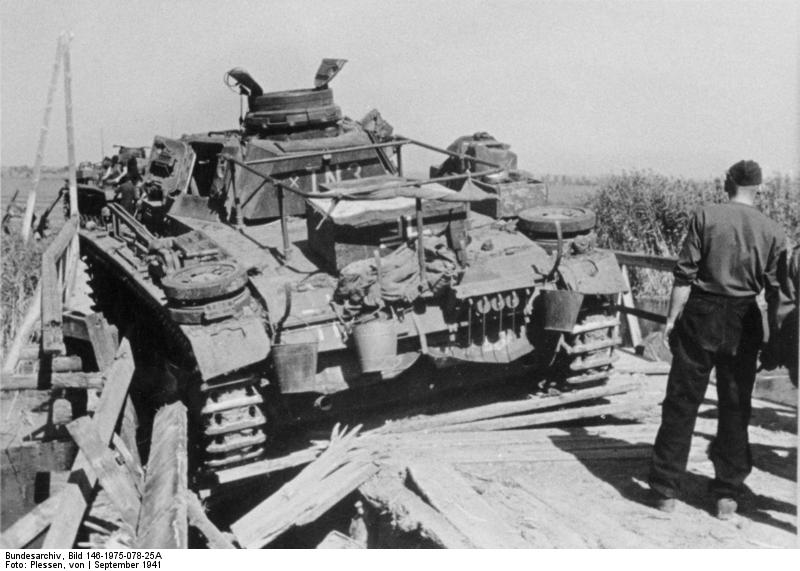
Panzer III tank equipped with the N.K.A.V.

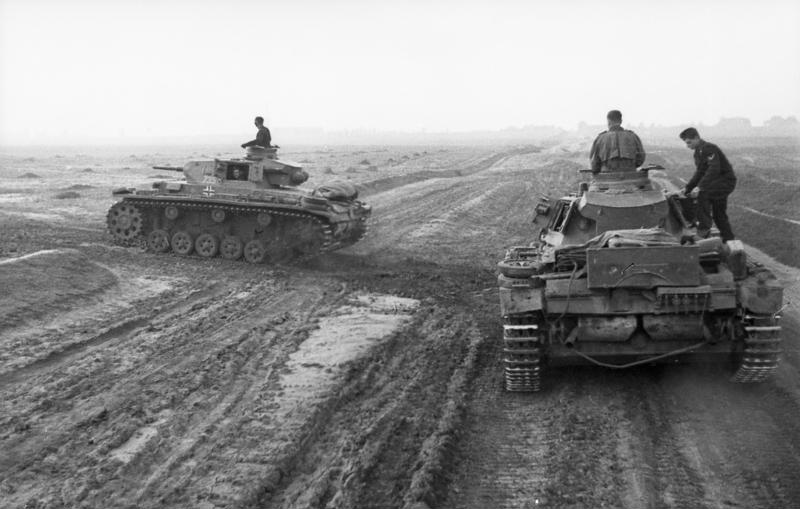
Panzer III tank equipped with the N.K.A.V.

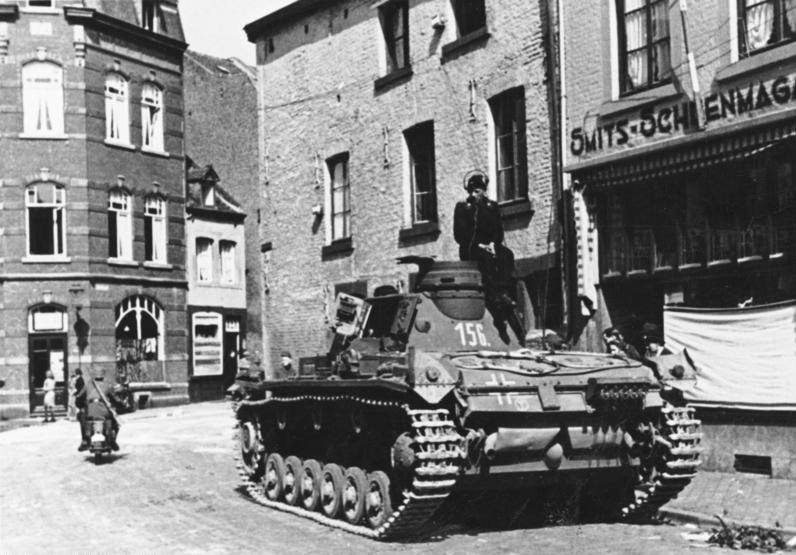
Panzer III tank with an N.K.A.V. mounted above the right muffler.

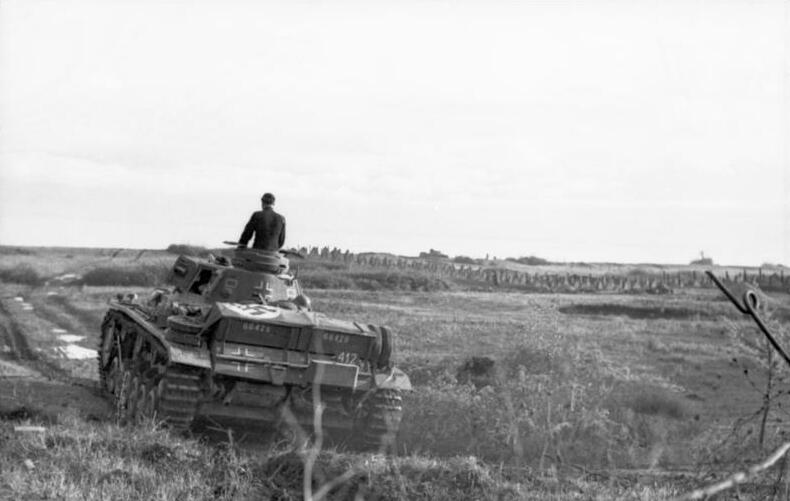
Panzer III with an armored N.K.A.V.

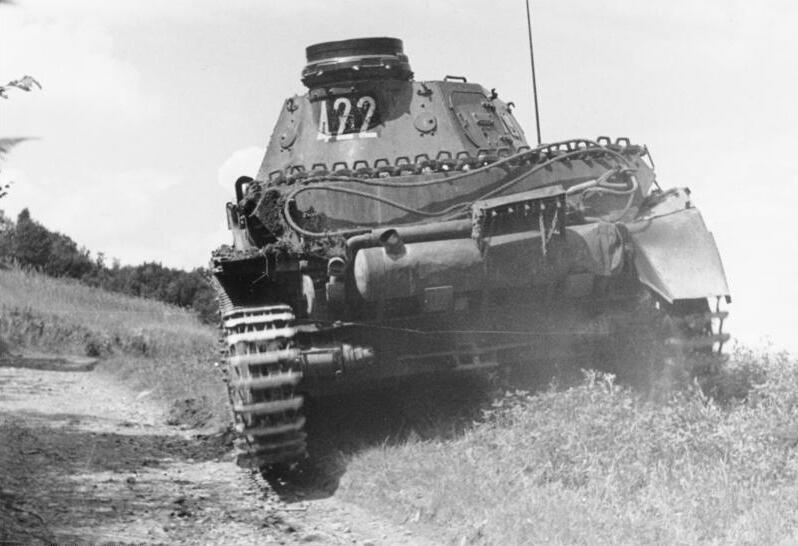
Panzer IV tank with an N.K.A.V. mounted above the muffler.

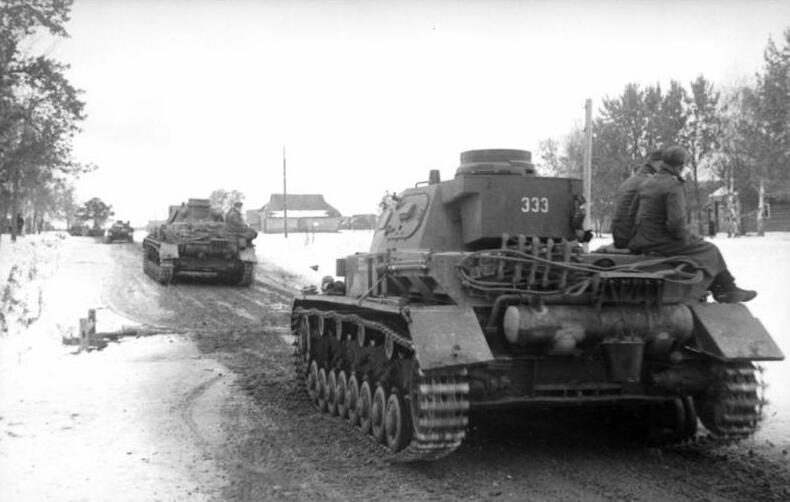
Panzer IV tank with an N.K.A.V. mounted above the muffler.

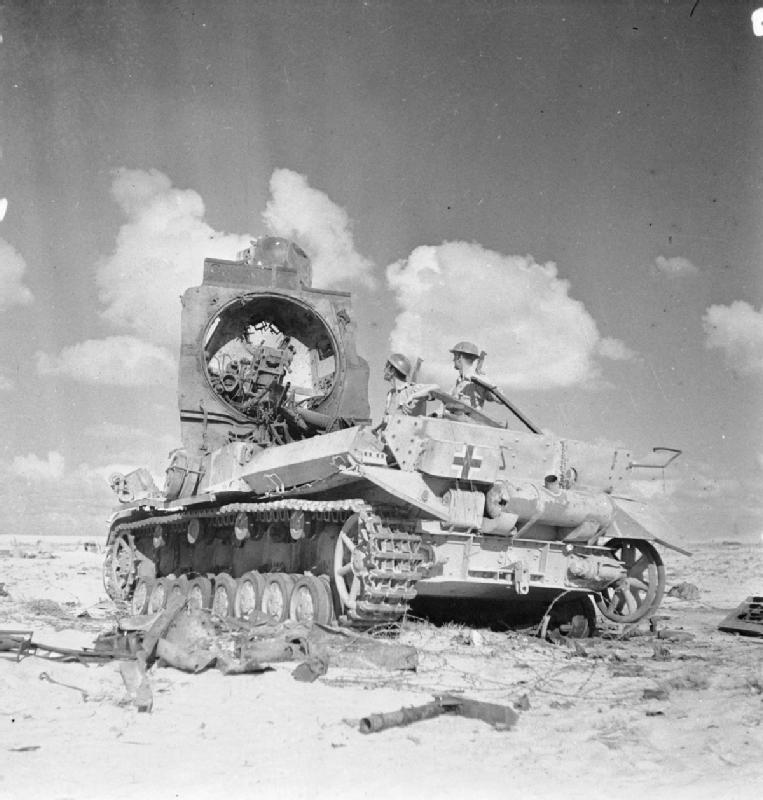
A destroyed Panzer IV with an armored N.K.A.V. painted with a Balkenkreuz.

== See also ==
- Nebelwurfgerät
- Minenabwurfvorrichtung
- Nahverteidigungswaffe
