= Airburst round =

Tactical explosive ammunition

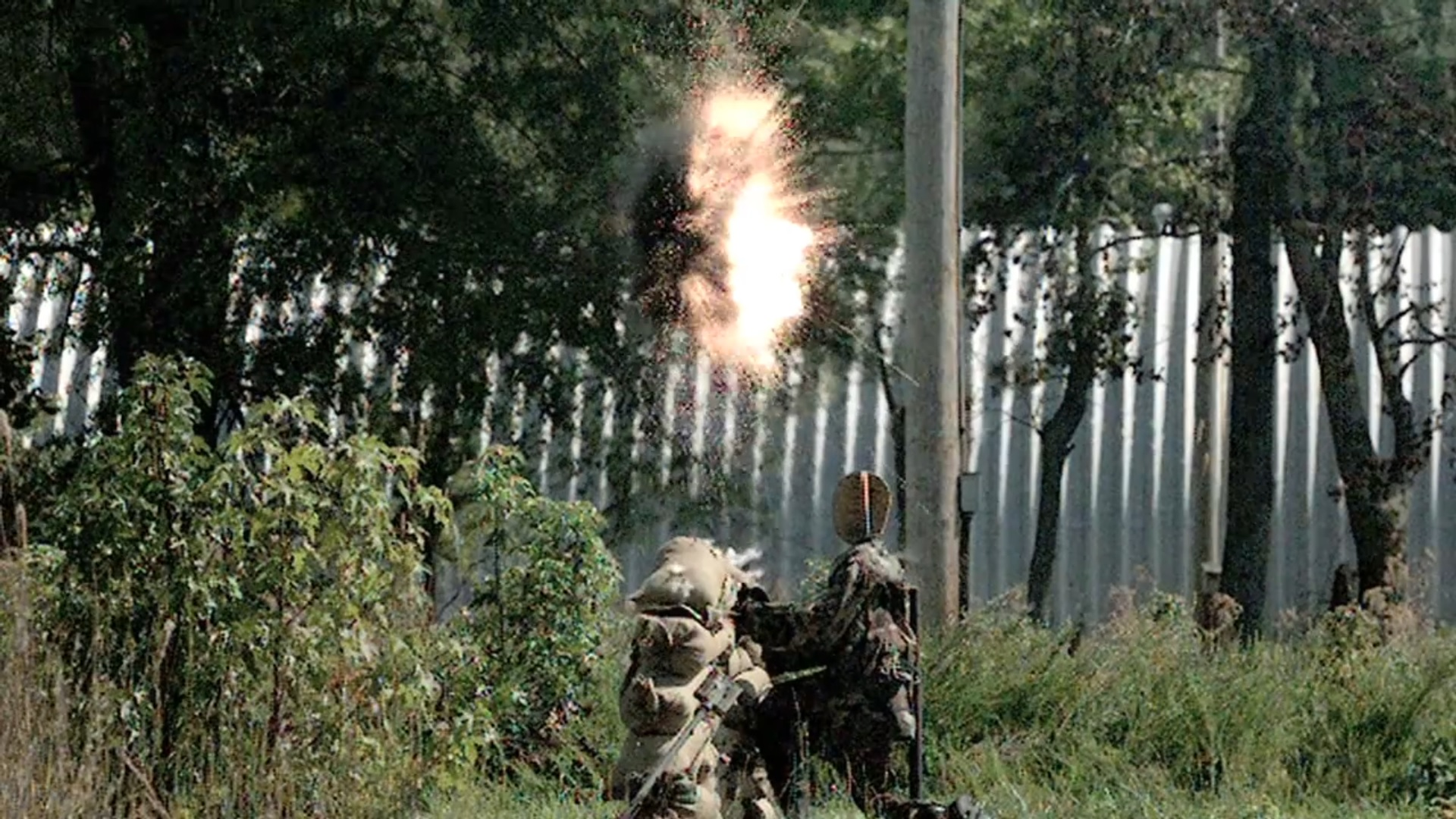
Airburst effect from 40mm round on dummy soldiers

An airburst round is a type of tactical anti-personnel and anti-aircraft explosive ammunition, typically a shell or grenade, that detonates in midair, causing air burst effect fragment damage to enemy personnel or aircraft (notably comparably unsophisticated unmanned aircraft systems such as modified racing drones). In the latter case, airburst rounds are used in anti-aircraft or "zenith" cannon, known in military slang as FLAK (from the German "fliegerabwehrkanone", air defence cannon) or ack-ack (from the British phonetic alphabet, as an initialism for Anti Air).

This makes it easier to hit enemy soldiers behind a wall, in a defensive fighting position, or in a confined space or room. It is used on many guns, from artillery to the hand-held XM25 Individual Airburst Weapon System (derived from the XM29 OICW). Unlike traditional grenades, such as the 40 mm grenade, smart grenades can be electronically programmed to explode after travelling a certain distance. A fire control computer or some other electronic sighting system is used to quickly program the electronic fuse with any distance, as conditions dictate.

Orbital ATK developed 30x173mm Mk310 PABM-T airburst rounds for Mk44 Bushmaster II.

== Terminology ==
It is also called an airburst shell, air burst grenade, programmable ammunition, 3P ammunition or smart grenade.

== List of airburst round platforms ==
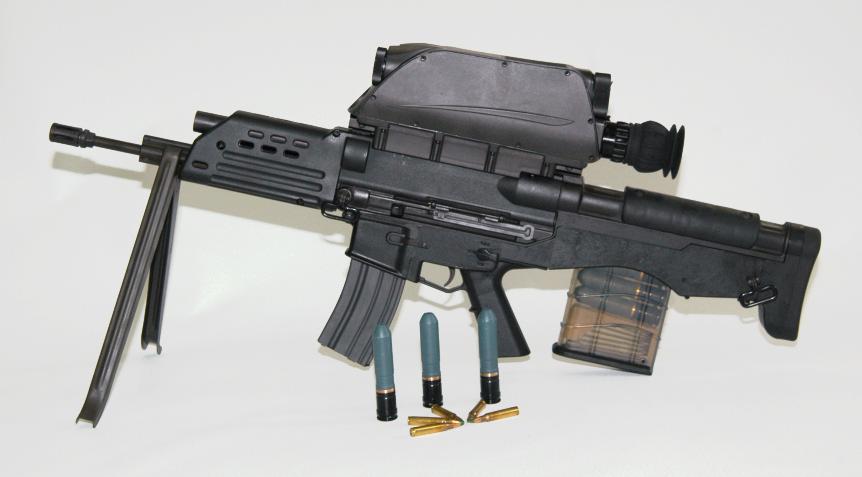
20mm grenades shown in front of an S&T Daewoo K11, a Korean Bullpup dual-barrel airburst multi-weapon.

- 20 mm grenade
  - XM29 OICW
  - Daewoo K11
  - QTS-11
- 25 mm grenade:
  - XM25 Individual Airburst Weapon System
  - XM307 Advanced Crew Served Weapon
  - Barrett XM109
- 30 mm
  - Shipunov 2A42
  - 2A72
  - Mk44 Bushmaster II
  - Rheinmetall MK30-2/ABM
  - Rheinmetall Wotan 30 ABM
  - Rheinmetall KCE
- 35 mm
  - PAPOP
  - Norinco QLU-11
  - Rheinmetall Wotan 35 ABM
  - Rheinmetall AHEAD 35
  - Skyshield; Skynex
- 40 mm
  - Bofors 40 mm gun
  - Mk 47 Striker
  - Multi Caliber Individual Weapon System
  - Norinco LG5
  - K40
  - 40mm CTA
  - Atom 40 mm
- 57 mm
  - AU-220M
- 84 mm
  - Carl Gustaf 8.4cm recoilless rifle
- 125 mm grenade
  - M-84AS1

== See also ==
- Traveling charge, proto-airburst round
- Precision-guided munition

== External media ==
- Video showing effects of 40mm programmable airburst ammunition
