= Objective Individual Combat Weapon =

US Army rifle development competition

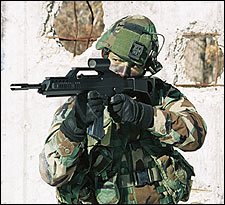
An early XM8 mockup after the break up; became part of OICW Increment 1

The Objective Individual Combat Weapon (OICW) was the next-generation service rifle competition under development as part of the United States Army OICW program; the program was discontinued without bringing the weapon out of the prototype phase. The acronym OICW is often used to refer to the entire weapons program.

It started in the aftermath of the Advanced Combat Rifle (ACR) during the 1980s. Like the ACR program, it has been a failure in terms of specific program goals (e.g., replacing the M16) and has cost millions of dollars, but has resulted in innovative weapons and weapon concepts as well as offshoot programs of its own.

== Development ==
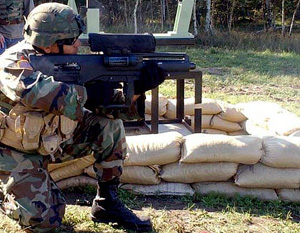
A working XM25 prototype is tested in 2005 as part of OICW Increment 2.

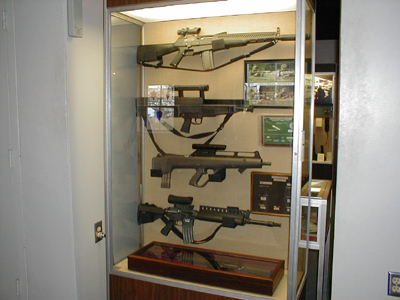
The final four ACR program test entrants

The central idea of the program was to develop a rifle that enabled the attacking of targets behind cover by using airburst munitions. The munitions were to be much smaller than pre-existing grenades and grenade launchers, but large enough to be effective. The idea was refined into a combination of a short assault rifle and semi-automatic, low-velocity cannon firing air-bursting munitions. The OICW aimed to use advances in computer technology in a weapon that fired grenades automatically pre-set to explode above or beside targets hidden from view. Fragmentation from the exploding grenades could hit the target when normal rifle fire could not.

The winners of the first competition for the project during the 1990s were ATK and firearms manufacturer Heckler & Koch with the XM29 OICW. They went on to build numerous prototypes of the rifle for the United States military in the late 1990s. These projects centered on using a programmable 20 mm airburst munition-firing rifle by itself or with other projectile-based weapons attached. The 20 mm launcher was analyzed in various configurations, including a launcher by itself, with a 5.56 mm weapon (based on the HK G36), or with a MP7 PDW.

By the early 2000s, the weapon had settled on a design and was classified as the XM29. The XM29 was based on the HK CAWS (Close Assault Weapon System) (Cal. 18.5×76mm or 12 Gauge non-conventional). However, the weapon had serious problems: it did not meet weight or cost targets, and the 20 mm High Explosive Air Bursting (HEAB) did not seem to be lethal enough in testing. To compound matters, the kinetic-energy component had to be light and short in length. As a result, the 5.56×45mm NATO barrel had a length of only 250 mm (9.8 inches), which is too short to generate enough muzzle velocity to be effective as a standard infantry rifle. It was also too heavy and too large to be operated effectively by a soldier.

This resulted in the army starting development on new weapons, and finally shelving the XM29 in 2004. The kinetic energy component split off into the XM8 rifle program and the airburst component developed into the XM25 airburst weapon. According to a presentation by Major Kevin Finch, Chief of the Small Arms Division of the Directorate of Combat Developments at the U.S. Army Infantry Center, there were three main parts to the OICW program:

- Increment 1 (OICW 1) was a competition for a whole weapon system family similar to the XM8. The weapon system was to potentially replace the M4 carbine, M16 rifle, M249 light machine gun and some M9 pistols. Other arms companies had contended that the OICW project goals had changed enough to warrant another competition. Potential challengers could include a weapons system based on an updated M16, the Steyr AUG, the FN SCAR, and potentially any other manufacturer that fulfilled the Army requirements for participating. It also listed the shotgun being replaced by a modular shotgun system (XM26 LSS) mounted on the OICW 1 winner. The Increment 1 portion was put on an eight-week hold in July 2005, primarily to take into account input and needs of other services. On October 31, 2005, the OICW I program was cancelled. The reason given for the cancellation was stated as: "This action has been taken in order for the Army to reevaluate its priorities for small caliber weapons, and to incorporate emerging requirements identified during Operation Enduring Freedom and Operation Iraqi Freedom. The Government will also incorporate studies looking into current capability gaps during said reevaluation."
- OICW Increment 2 was a stand-alone airburst weapon the (XM25). This is a standalone launcher that uses bigger 25 mm munition, and was intended to be a special applications and support weapon, not an individual combat weapon as previous models were. In 2005, the weapon underwent limited field trials and combat testing.
- OICW Increment 3 was the XM29. The M203 was listed as being replaced by a combination of Increments 2 and 3. The M249 was also to be partially replaced by a lightweight MG (LMGA, now LSAT), which was listed as being the successor to the M60 and M240.

== Related weapons ==
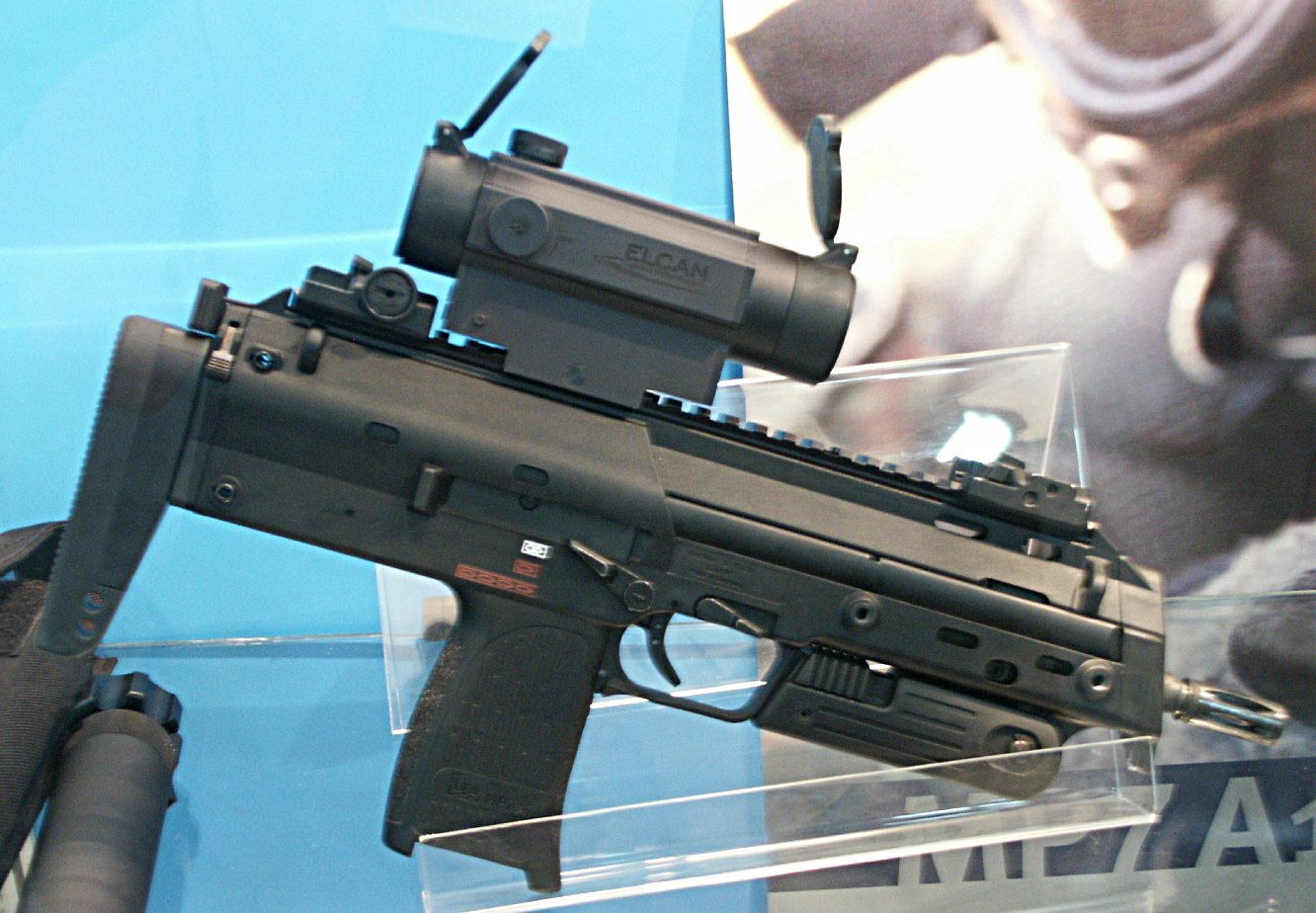
The Heckler & Koch MP7, conceptualized in the late 1990s as the kinetic energy component of the SABR (later XM29); the XM29 was put on hold, but the MP7 entered production in 2001

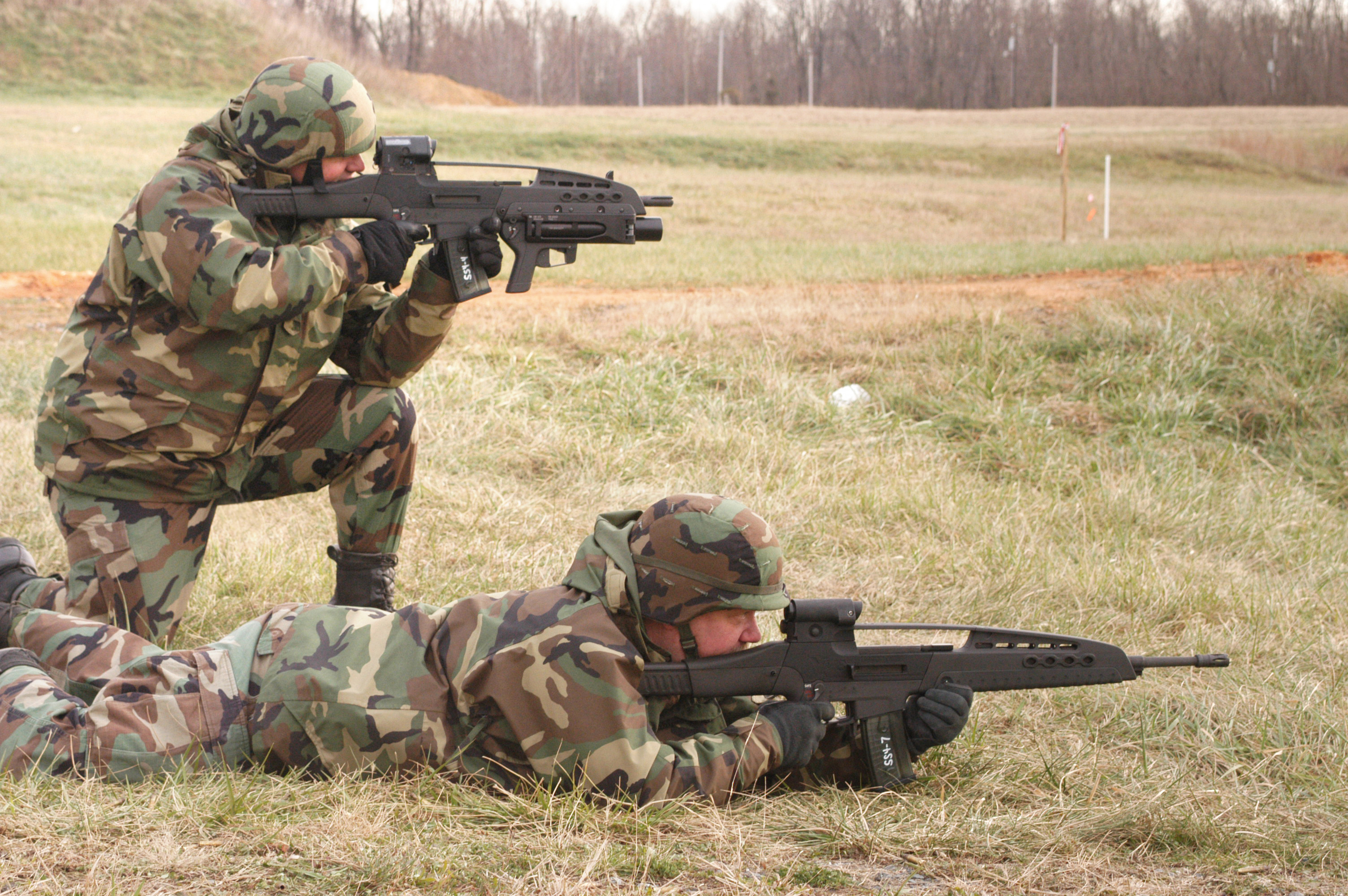
One tester is kneeling with a XM8 Carbine and XM320 attached, the other has the XM8 sharpshooter

In the aftermath of the ACR program, the OICW program began. There were two main contenders, one design by AAI and its companies, and the other by ATK (with H&K and other companies); ATK and H&K won.

OICW concepts/prototypes in the 1990s:

- 20 mm smart grenade and 5.56 mm rifle in side by side configuration
- 20 mm smart grenade stand alone unit (XM25)
- 20 mm smart grenade and MP7
- 20 mm smart grenade and 5.56 mm rifle in over-under configuration (XM29 OICW)

Some weapon programs involved with, stemming from, or using technology from the OICW project include:

- XM1018 (25×40mm HEAB Ammunition)
- XM8 rifle (5.56 kinetic energy component)
- M320 (40 mm grenade launcher originally developed for the XM8)
- XM25 (Uses low velocity 25×40mm smart airburst munition, semi-automatic standalone grenade launcher)
- XM109 (Uses high velocity 25×59mm munition, anti-materiel rifle)
- XM307 ACSW (Uses high velocity 25×59mm smart airburst munition, automatic grenade launcher)
  - XM312 (.50 BMG version of XM307)
- Mk 47 (Mk 47 Mod 0) (40 mm automatic grenade launcher capable of using smart 40 mm airburst grenades)
- Land Warrior
- XM26 Lightweight Shotgun System (A lightweight 12-gauge bolt-action accessory shotgun)

== See also ==
- 80.002 – (Soviet Union)
- Advanced Individual Combat Weapon – (Australia)
- FN F2000 – (Belgium)
- PAPOP – (France)
- Daewoo K11 – (South Korea)
- Neopup PAW-20 – (South Africa)
- QTS-11 – (China)
- Special Purpose Individual Weapon – (United States)
- NIVA XM1970
- Advanced Combat Rifle – (United States)
- HK CAWS – (Germany)
- List of individual weapons of the U.S. Armed Forces
- List of crew served weapons of the US Armed Forces
- List of modern infantry related terms and acronyms
