= Air burst =

Detonation of an explosive above a target for increased pressure wave damage

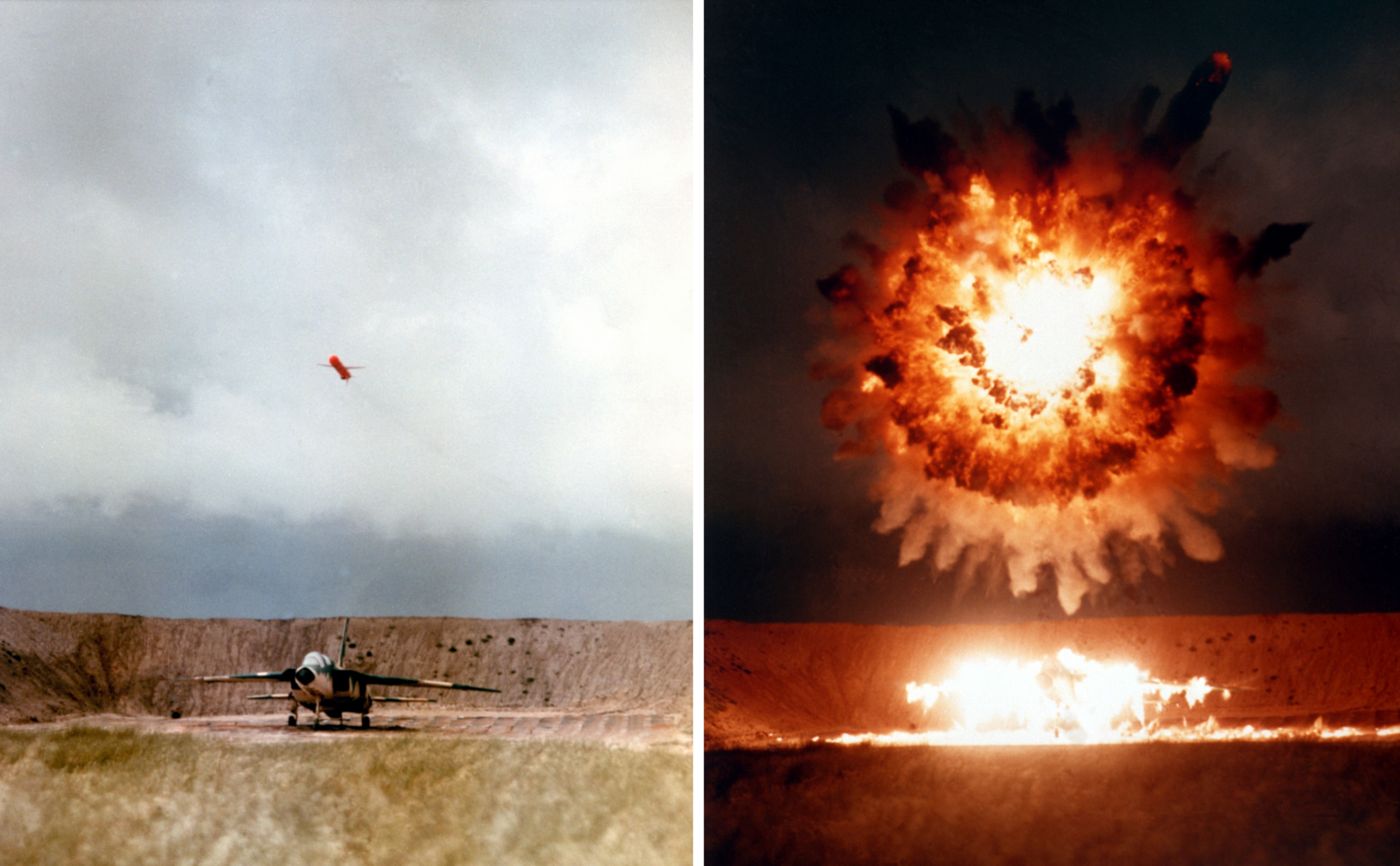
UGM-109 Tomahawk missile detonates above a test target, 1986.

An air burst or airburst is the detonation of an explosive device such as an anti-personnel artillery shell or a nuclear weapon in the air instead of on contact with the ground or target. The principal military advantage of an air burst over a ground burst is that the energy from the explosion, including any shell fragments, is distributed more evenly over a wider area; however, the peak energy is lower at ground zero.

== History ==
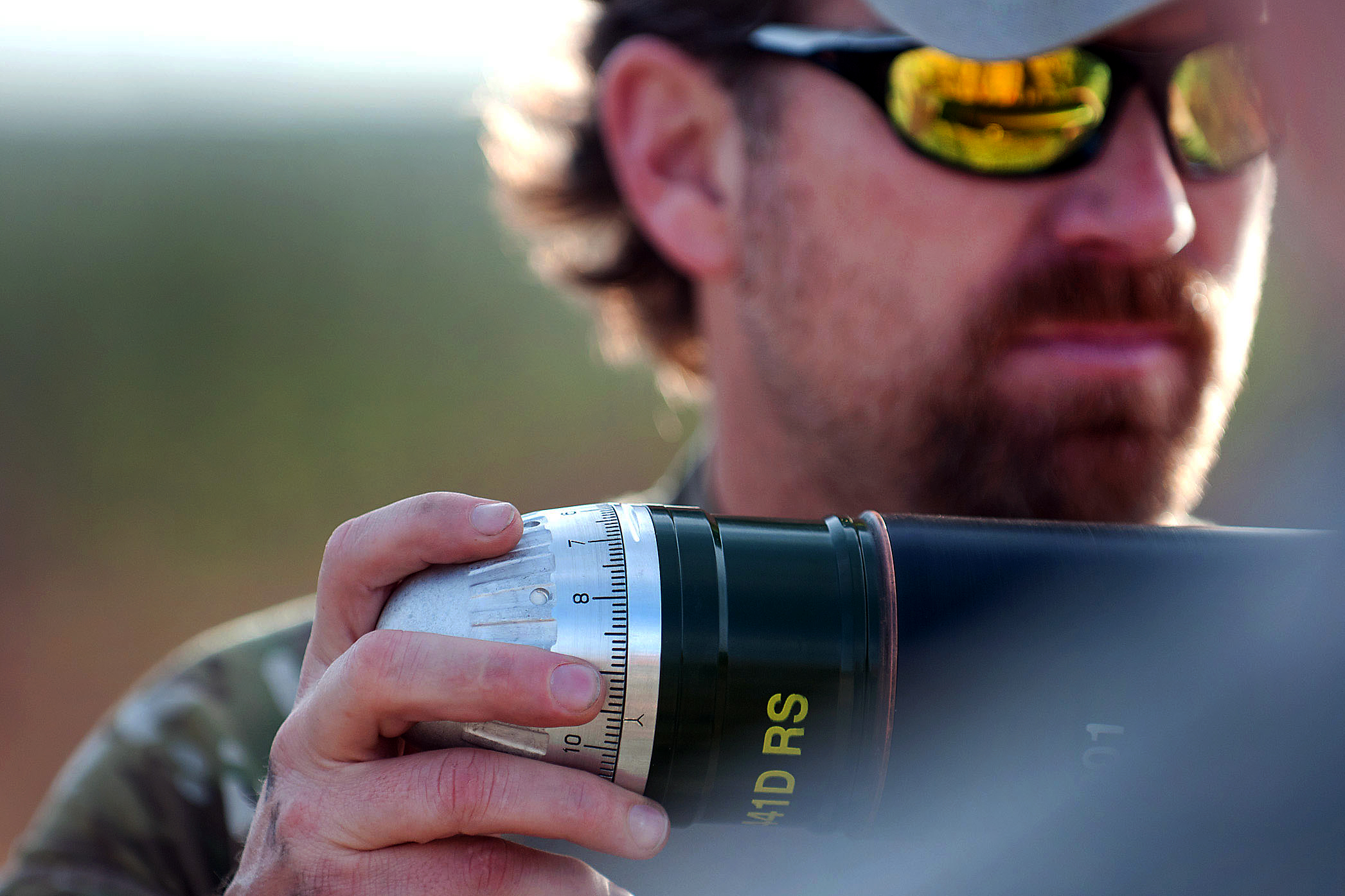
The airburst fuzing system on a modern Carl Gustav recoilless rifle High Explosive round

The shrapnel shell was invented by Henry Shrapnel of the British Army in about 1780 to increase the effectiveness of canister shot. It was used in the later Napoleonic wars and stayed in use until superseded in Artillery of World War I. Modern shells, though sometimes called "shrapnel shells", actually produce fragments and splinters, not shrapnel.

Air bursts were used in the First World War to shower enemy positions and men with shrapnel balls to kill the largest possible number with a single burst. When infantry moved into deep trenches, shrapnel shells were rendered useless, and high-explosive shells were used to attack field fortifications. The time fuses for the shells could be set to function on contact or in the air, or at a certain time after contact.

Early anti-aircraft warfare used time fuses to function when they reached the estimated altitude of the target. During World War II a "proximity fuze" was developed for antiaircraft use, controlled by a Doppler radar device within the shell that caused it to explode when near the target. The idea was later adapted for use against ground targets.

During the Vietnam War, air bursting shells were used to great effect to defend bases. This tactic was known as "Killer Junior" when referring to 105 mm (4.1 in) or 155 mm (6.1 in) shells, and "Killer Senior" when employed with larger howitzers.

Some anti-personnel bounding mines such as Germany's World War II "Bouncing Betty" fire a grenade into the air, which detonates at waist level, increasing the blast radius and harm inflicted by detonation, shock wave, and flying splinters.

A relatively recent example of airburst munitions is the VOG-25P "jumping" 40 mm (1.6 in) caseless grenade, which contains a secondary charge to launch it up to 1.5 m (4.9 ft) above its point of impact before the main charge detonates. Another recent development is a computer programmable air burst grenade with fire control system. Grenade launchers using this technology include the XM29, XM307, PAPOP, Mk 47 Striker, XM25, Barrett XM109, K11, QTS-11, Norinco LG5 / QLU-11, and Multi Caliber Individual Weapon System.

Orbital ATK developed air burst rounds for autocannons.

=== Nuclear weapons ===
A blast wave reflecting from a surface and forming a mach stem

The air burst is usually 100 to 1,000 m (330 to 3,280 ft) above the hypocenter to allow the shockwave of the fission or fusion driven explosion to bounce off the ground and back into itself, combining two wave fronts and creating a shockwave that is more forceful than the one resulting from a detonation at ground level. This "mach stem" only occurs near ground level, exists around the entire perimeter of the expanding wave front near ground level, and is similar in shape to the letter Y when viewed from the side (see sliced view). Airbursting also minimizes fallout by keeping the fireball from touching the ground, limiting the amount of debris that is vaporized and drawn up in the radioactive debris cloud. For the Hiroshima bomb, an air burst 550 to 610 m (1,800 to 2,000 ft) above the ground was chosen "to achieve maximum blast effects, and to minimize residual radiation on the ground as it was hoped U.S. troops would soon occupy the city".

Some nuclear weapons have a contact preclusion fuzing feature to prevent the backup contact fuze from detonating the weapon if the air burst fuzing fails.

== Tactics ==
In conventional warfare, air bursts are used primarily against infantry in the open or unarmored targets, as the resulting fragments cover a large area but will not penetrate armor or field fortifications.

In nuclear warfare, air bursts are used against soft targets (i.e. lacking the hardened construction required to survive overpressure from a nuclear explosion) such as cities in countervalue targeting, or airfields, radar systems and mobile ICBMs in counterforce targeting.

=== Killer Junior and Senior ===
Killer Junior and Killer Senior are techniques of employing artillery direct fire air bursts, first developed during the Vietnam War. The technique involves a howitzer firing a high explosive (HE) shell using a mechanical time–super quick (MTSQ) artillery fuze set to cause an airburst over a target in very close proximity to the firing gun's position. Set properly, the shell would detonate approximately 10 meters (33 feet) above the ground at ranges of 200 to 1,000 m (660 to 3,280 ft).

The term Killer Junior was applied to this technique when used with 105 mm (4.1 in) or 155 mm (6.1 in) howitzers, and the term Killer Senior applied to its use with the M115 203 mm (8.0 in) howitzer. The term "Killer" came from the call-sign of the battery which developed the technique. The technique was later perfected by Lieutenant Colonel Robert Dean, commander of the 1st Battalion, 8th Field Artillery Regiment, of the 25th Infantry Division Artillery.

Killers Junior and Senior were developed as alternatives to the Beehive flechette rounds previously used against nearby enemy troops. The advantage of the Killer techniques over Beehive is that the airburst projects fragments in all directions, and is able to wound enemies crawling or lying in defilade, whereas the flechettes of a Beehive round would simply fly harmlessly over a low target.

== See also ==
- Airburst round
- Laydown delivery
- Toss bombing
- Munition fuzes
- Meteor air burst
