= XM29 OICW =

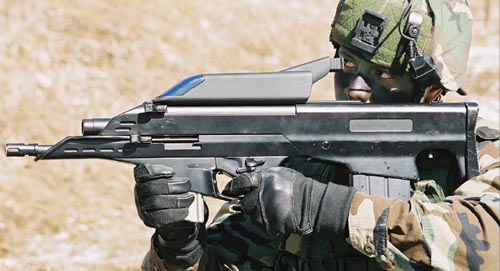
- A mock-up of a later XM29 variant.
- Type: Assault rifle with bullpup grenade launcher module
- Place of origin: United States; Germany

Production history
- Designer: Heckler & Koch, Alliant Techsystems
- Manufacturer: Heckler & Koch, Alliant Techsystems
- Produced: 1996–2004 (prototypes only)
- Variants: XM8 and XM25

Specifications
- Mass: 5.4 kg empty and 6.81 kg loaded (planned); 6.8 kg unloaded and 8.17 kg loaded (actual)
- Length: 890 mm (35 in)
- Barrel length: KE Module: 250 mm (9.8 in); HE Module: 460 mm (18 in)
- Cartridge: KE Module: 5.56×45mm NATO; HE Module: 20×28mm grenade
- Caliber: KE Module: 5.56 mm; HE Module: 20 mm
- Action: Gas-operated, rotating bolt
- Rate of fire: 800-850 rounds/min (KE Module); 10 rounds/min (HE Module)
- Muzzle velocity: 750 m/s (2,500 ft/s) (KE); 180 m/s (590 ft/s) (HE)
- Effective firing range: ~600-800m (Max ~3,000m) HE: 1,000m (Max: ~2,000m)
- Feed system: KE Module: Various STANAG magazines; HE Module: 5-round detachable box magazine
- Sights: Integrated 6× thermal vision, night vision optics with computer-assisted sighting and laser rangefinder

The XM29 OICW (Objective Individual Combat Weapon) was a series of prototypes of a new type of assault rifle that fired 20 mm HE airbursting projectiles. The prototypes were developed as part of the Objective Individual Combat Weapon program in the 1990s. The term SABR (Selectable Assault Battle Rifle) was also used at certain points, but is less common.

== Overview ==
Developed by Alliant Techsystems, with Heckler & Koch as a major subcontractor, the most commonly seen version of the XM29 consisted of a semi-automatic 20×28mm smart grenade launcher, an underslung "KE" assault carbine (derived from the HK G36 then in its late developmental stage) firing a standard 5.56×45mm NATO round, and a top-mounted computer-assisted sighting system with integrated laser rangefinder, thermal vision night vision capabilities, and up to 6× optical telescopic sight. Earlier designs used different configurations and setups.

The launcher part has been described variously as a light semi-automatic 20 mm cannon, a grenade launcher, or an airburst weapon. It poses a classification problem, in that it does not fit neatly into any one category. On one hand, it uses much smaller shells and has a much flatter trajectory than grenade launchers. On the other, while its caliber and velocity is more similar to light cannon, it does share traits with other infantry grenade launchers.

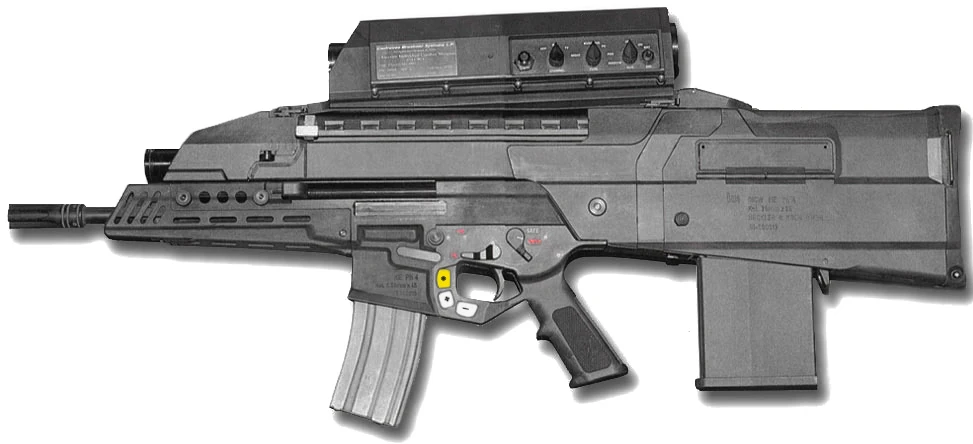
A HK OICW from 1999, commonly depicted in video games and the predecessor of the XM29.

Various problems have effectively ended the program as it was originally envisioned, including weight, bulk, and lack of effectiveness of the 20×28 mm airburst round. Upon cancellation in 2004, it was split into three related programs. OICW Increment One is a program to develop a family of light kinetic energy weapons, OICW Increment Two is a program to develop the airburst grenade launcher as a standalone component, and OICW Increment Three is a program to re-integrate the two components. The XM8 was developed in an attempt to meet Increment One requirements. Instead a new program known as Lightweight Small Arms Technologies (LSAT) was begun. Meanwhile, the XM25 25×40mm airburst launcher began development to meet the Increment Two requirements. Increment Three will not be initiated until after One and Two are completed.

The OICW Increment One Request for Proposals was cancelled in October 2005, while development of the 25×40mm XM25 continued, and the 25×59mm OCSW program as well until its termination. It is not clear if LSAT is intended to meet the goals of OICW Increment One or if it is a standalone weapon system. However, for all intents and purposes, the OICW program is no longer under development.

== See also ==
- List of bullpup firearms
- List of grenade launchers
- 80.002 – (Soviet Union)
- Advanced Individual Combat Weapon – (Australia)
- PAPOP – (France)
- QTS-11 – (China)
- S&T Daewoo K11 – (South Korea)
