= XM25 CDTE =

XM25 Counter Defilade Target Engagement System
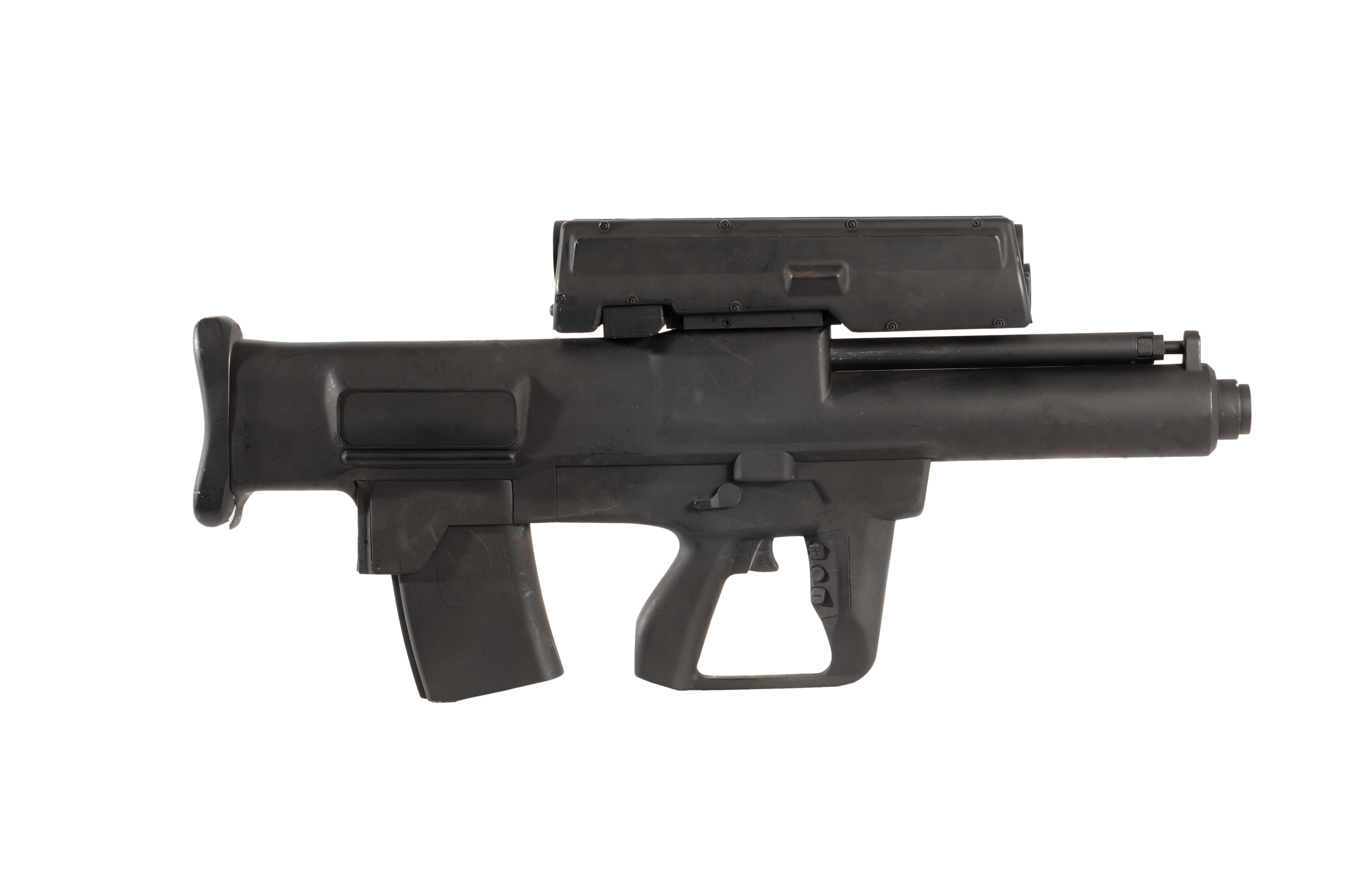
- Type: Bullpup grenade launcher
- Place of origin: United States and Germany

Service history
- In service: 2010–2013 (field evaluations)
- Used by: United States Army
- Wars: War in Afghanistan

Production history
- Designer: Heckler & Koch; Orbital ATK
- Manufacturer: Heckler & Koch
- Unit cost: US$30,000–35,000

Specifications
- Mass: 6.35 kg (14.0 lb) empty
- Length: 749 mm (29.5 in)
- Cartridge: 25×40mm grenade
- Caliber: 25 mm
- Muzzle velocity: 690 ft/s (210 m/s)
- Effective firing range: 550 yd (500 m) for point targets 765 yd (700 m) for area targets
- Maximum firing range: 1,100 yd (1,000 m)
- Feed system: 5-round detachable box magazine

The XM25 Counter Defilade Target Engagement (CDTE) System, also known as the Punisher and Individual Semiautomatic Air Burst System was an airburst grenade launcher with programmable ammunition derived from the XM29 OICW. It was fielded to soldiers serving in the War in Afghanistan in 2010, after which malfunctions and 2013 program budget cuts delayed official entry into service, planned for early 2017. In early 2017, the contract with Orbital ATK was cancelled, calling the future of the entire program into question. The program was officially terminated on 24 July 2018.

== Design ==
The XM25 CDTE fires 25 mm grenades that are set to explode in mid-air at or near the target. A laser rangefinder in the weapon is used to determine the distance to the target. The user can manually adjust the detonating distance by up to 10 feet (3.0 m) shorter or longer; the XM25 automatically transmits the detonating distance to the grenade in the firing chamber. The grenade tracks the distance it has traveled by the number of spiral rotations after it is fired, then detonates at the proper distance to produce an airburst effect. These features make the XM25 more effective than traditional grenade launchers at the task of hitting targets that are behind cover or dug into the ground.

The system was developed by Alliant Techsystems and Heckler & Koch, while the target acquisition/fire control was developed by L-3 IOS Brashear.

The M203 grenade launcher has an effective range for point targets of 150 m (160 yd), and a maximum range for area targets of 350 m (380 yd). The XM25 has an effective range for point targets of 600 m (660 yd), and a maximum range for area targets of 700 m (770 yd). Studies indicate that the XM25 with air burst rounds is 300 percent more effective at engaging the enemy than other squad-level grenade launchers.

In 2014, the U.S. Army was working on a 40 mm autonomous airburst Small Arms Grenade Munitions (SAGM) round to give 40 mm grenade launchers airburst capabilities as a complementary system to the XM25.

=== Drawbacks ===
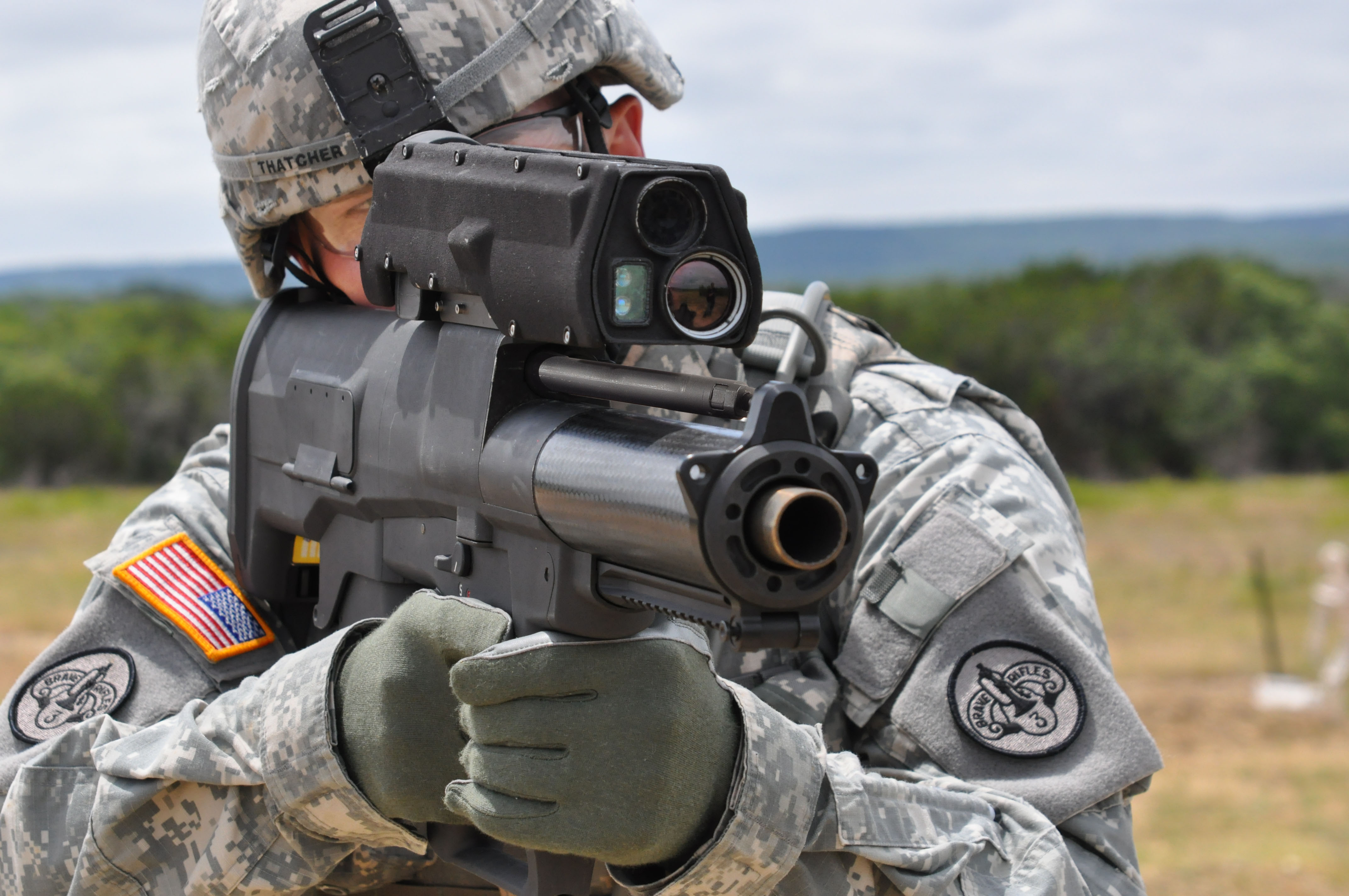
A soldier aims an XM25 weapon system at Aberdeen Test Center

In March 2013, elements of the 75th Ranger Regiment refused to take the 14 lb (6.4 kg) weapon on a raid because they found it too heavy and cumbersome. They also felt its low basic ammunition load and magazine capacity of 25 mm grenades were not enough to justify the removal of an M4A1 carbine from the mission.

Although the XM25 enables infantry units to engage enemies hiding behind cover, the weapon has been met with several points of criticism, specifically that it requires soldiers to exchange their rifle and use it as their primary weapon, making them unable to perform required tasks in many squad battle drills; there is also concern that the operator has a reduced capacity to engage targets at close range and that its basic load of 36 rounds can be depleted too quickly in direct-fire engagements.

Furthermore, critics have said that the system is too heavy for an individual soldier to carry. A US soldier equipped with an M4 carbine (the US Armed Forces primary infantry weapon), attachments and ammunition has to carry a 16 lb (7.3 kg) load. With the addition of a M320 grenade launcher and ammunition the total increases to 38 lb (17 kg). An XM25 with 36 rounds of ammunition is a 35 lb (16 kg) weapon load alone. If this was swapped in for the M320 grenade launcher, this means the infantryman needs to carry a larger load of 51 lb (23 kg).

=== Specifications ===
- Caliber: Low-velocity 25mm × 40 grenade
  - Thermobaric
  - Flechette
  - Training
  - High-explosive airbursting round (HEAB)
  - Non-lethal
  - Armor Piercing (50 mm (2.0 in) armor penetration)
  - Door breaching
- High Explosive Air Bursting (HEAB) Firing Modes:
  - Airburst (In front of or over aiming point)
  - Point Detonation
  - Point Detonation Delay
  - Window (Beyond aiming point)
- Operation: Gas operated semi-automatic
- System weight: 14 lb (6.4 kg)
- Target acquisition/fire control (XM104)
  - Weight: 2.54 lb (1.15 kg)
  - 4× thermal sight with zoom
  - 2× direct view optical sight
  - Ballistic computer
  - Digital compass
  - Laser rangefinder
  - Ammunition fuze setter
  - Environmental sensors

== History ==
The XM25 began as an offshoot of the Objective Individual Combat Weapon program that started in the late 1990s. The U.S. Army Research Laboratory was the technical lead for the Program Manager Soldier Weapons, who worked on the development of the XM25 25 mm individual air burst weapon system. The system was designed to enhance the capability of individual soldiers to defeat targets in defilade. The XM25 had been utilized in Afghanistan with support from ARL personnel involved in training soldiers, enabling and evaluating XM25 combat tactical integration, and collecting data for the Engineering and Manufacturing Development phase of the contract. The XM25 design included hardware modifications to improve reliability, weight, and fire control lasers optimized to increase range performance against targets out to 2,000 meters away. Additional modifications addressed weapon ergonomics including butt-plate configuration, rear bolt buffer housing and recoil optimization.

The XM29 was intended to be an individual combat weapon that combined a rifle and airburst grenade launcher. It weighed 18 lb (8.2 kg), far more than an individual rifle or grenade launcher. Its 20 mm airbursting grenades weighed half as much as 230 g (8.1 oz) 40mm grenades. These lighter grenades were less effective at suppressing the enemy or putting them out of action. In August 2003, the XM29 roles were separated into specific weapons, with the rifle pursued as the XM8, and the OICW Increment 2 standalone airburst component as the XM25. As a standalone launcher, it was intended to be a special applications and support weapon, able to fire larger 270 g (9.5 oz) 25 mm grenade rounds which would generate 50 percent more, and heavier, fragments within a 6 m (20 ft) radius compared to the experimental 20 mm grenades. In 2005, six weapons underwent limited field trials and combat testing. Two years later, they were sent overseas for testing in combat situations. The XM25 was planned to be sent into theater in 2008, but minor suggestions from users and tests revealed design elements that needed to be refined.

=== Deployment to Afghanistan ===
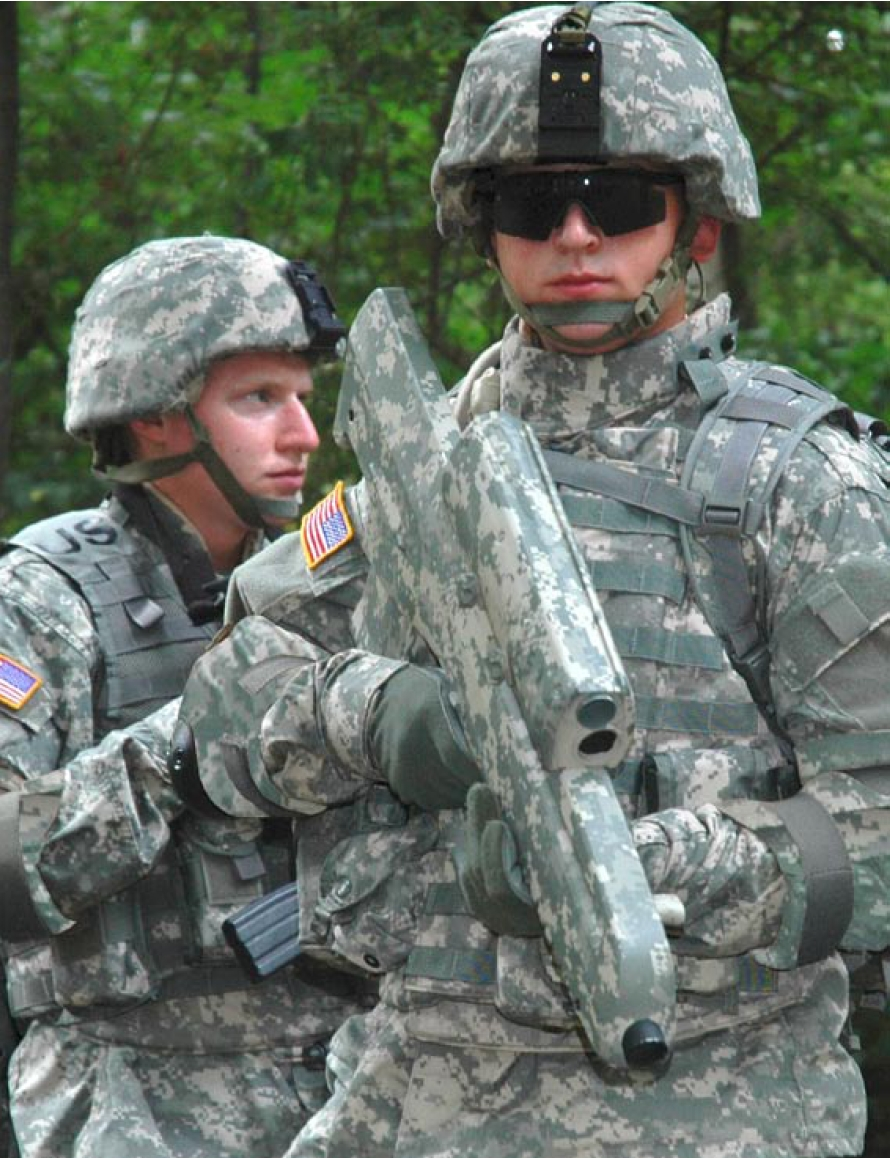
A U.S. soldier wielding an XM-25 decorated in the Universal Camouflage Pattern

In the summer of 2010, the United States Army began field testing the XM25 in Afghanistan, with an initial per-unit cost of the early models ranging from US$30,000 to $35,000. Five were deployed with the 101st Airborne Division in Afghanistan in October 2010, along with 1,000 hand-made airburst rounds. The soldiers reported that the weapon was extremely effective at killing or neutralizing enemy combatants firing on US troops from covered positions. US troops nicknamed the weapon "The Punisher." First contact was on 3 December 2010. As of February 2011, the weapon had been fired 55 times in nine engagements by two units in different locations. It had disrupted two insurgent attacks on observation posts, destroyed two PKM machine gun positions, and destroyed four ambush sites. In one engagement, an enemy machine gunner was wounded by, or so frightened of, the XM25 that he dropped his weapon and ran away. The units with the XM25s had no casualties during the nine engagements. The weapon was called "revolutionary" and "a game-changer." One platoon leader commented that engagements that would normally take 15 to 20 minutes were over in just a few minutes. They performed flawlessly with no maintenance problems. Soldiers were so pleased that they carried it as their primary weapon without carrying an M4 carbine as a secondary. There were no complaints about its weight, but improvements to the battery life and a range increase to 1,000 meters were sought. Each round was hand built at a cost of $1,000.

The US Army ordered 36 more of the rifles in January 2012. On 12 September 2012, Alliant Techsystems received a $16.8 million engineering and manufacturing development contract modification for the XM25. ATK was to support another Army XM25 forward operational assessment scheduled for 2013 with a 36-gun battalion set of new pre-production prototypes.

=== Misfiring ===
On 2 February 2013, an XM25 exploded during a live-fire training event in Panjwai Afghanistan with Fierce Company 52nd Infantry, 1st Battalion 38th Infantry, 4th Brigade 2nd Infantry Division. The primer and propellant ignited as the result of a double feed, although safety mechanisms prevented the round's warhead from detonating. The gun was inoperable after the explosion and the soldier received superficial injuries. In response, the Army removed the XM25 from service in Afghanistan. ATK noted that there were nearly 5,900 rounds fired between failures. The misfiring caused the Army to delay the decision to move the XM25 into full-rate production, pending changes to the design of the weapon and ammunition, operating procedures, and training techniques. Testing continued at Aberdeen Proving Ground, where developers incorporated 130 design improvements. Despite the incident, Pentagon budget proposals included $69 million for 1,400 XM25 systems. The Army planned on a total of 10,876 units, two per infantry squad and one per special forces team.

=== Funding cut ===
In June 2013, the Senate Armed Services Committee eliminated all funding for the 1,400 XM25 systems the Army wanted to purchase from the 2014 budget. The malfunction in February raised concerns about the safety and effectiveness of the weapon. The "unreliable performance" of the weapon led to funding being cut, as well as the recommendation to review alternative airburst weapon systems.

In August 2013, the Army announced that the XM25 may move to low-rate initial production (LRIP) by August 2014. The weapon was in the engineering and manufacturing development (EMD) phase and not yet ready for fielding. By August 2014, it was expected to reach Milestone C, starting LRIP for 1,100 weapons and needed ammunition. Low-rate production would lead to type-classification, resulting in removing the "X" from its designation. Improvements were being made concerning the fire control system, battery life, weight, and magazine size. The XM25 was expected to be combat-ready by the end of 2015, and be fielded with all brigade combat teams, as well as the Army Special Operations Command, special forces detachments, and ranger regiments. Automated production will reduce the price of the system to $35,000 for the weapon and fire control system, and $55 per round.

As of October 2015, the weapon was in the second round of contractor validation testing, with a Pre-Production Qualification Test (PPQT) to be conducted in spring 2016, which could lead to a Milestone C decision by August 2016. Since its first deployment, the XM25 has been updated by replacing the boxy 2X Fire Control System (FCS) with a more compact, streamlined FCS that has greater 3X magnification and improved weapon weight, accuracy, and reliability. If requirements are fulfilled and budgets hold, the XM25 could be fielded in early 2017. On 29 August 2016, the Defense Department Inspector General's Office released a report recommending the Army determine whether to proceed with or cancel the XM25 program after reviewing the results of 2016 Governmental testing, scheduled to be completed in fall 2016. Army leaders maintain that the weapon provides revolutionary capabilities to the soldier, and that safety concerns have been addressed through engineering design changes and improvements over 30 additional months of testing. Although one XM25 was planned to be distributed in each deployed squad, fiscal constraints would alter that plan.

=== Litigation ===
In 2017 Orbital ATK filed suit via the U.S. District court in the district of Minnesota against Heckler and Koch for damages of over US$27 million, claiming failure to deliver 20 XM25 prototype units. The filing also requested transfer of intellectual property to allow Orbital ATK to contract another vendor for production of the system. The complaint stated that Heckler and Koch had wished legal clarification regarding potential violations of the Saint Petersburg Declaration of 1868, which bans "any projectile of a weight below 400 grams" containing explosives. After consultation Heckler and Koch had stipulated that the US Government issue a special certification regarding use of the weapons system. The US Government did not issue such and negotiations broke down. In April 2017, the Army cancelled its contract with Orbital ATK after they failed to deliver 20 weapons as specified by the terms, putting the operational future of the XM25 in jeopardy.

On 24 July 2018, the Army signed a memorandum officially terminating the program, after settling the lawsuit with Orbital ATK that gave the military intellectual property rights to the weapons and ammunition.

=== Program status ===
- April 2005 - First prototypes are delivered to the U.S. Army for field-testing.
- September 2005 - Test firing by regular troops at Grafenwöhr Training Area.
- November 2010 - Preliminary deployment in Afghanistan.
- 3 December 2010 - First contact.
- 12 September 2012 - EMD contract.
- 2 February 2013 - Misfire during live-fire event, XM25 removed from field in Afghanistan.
- June 2013 - Funding cut for XM25.
- August 2016 - Pentagon Inspector General report urges final decision on XM25 fielding or cancellation.
- April 2017 - Army cancels XM25 contract with Orbital ATK.
- July 2018 - Army officially terminates XM25.

== See also ==
- List of individual weapons of the U.S. Armed Forces
- List of bullpup firearms
- List of grenade launchers
- Barrett XM109 – (United States)
- Mk 47 Striker – (United States)
- PAW-20 – (South Africa)
- S&T Daewoo K11 – (South Korea)
- STK SSW (firearm) – (Singapore)
- QTS-11 – (China)
- XM8 rifle – (Germany)
- XM307 – (United States)
