= QTS-11 =

Type 11 Integrated Combat System
- Type: Dual barrel integrated Airburst grenade launcher/Assault rifle multi-weapon system
- Place of origin: China

Service history
- In service: 2015–present
- Used by: People's Liberation Army Ground Force; People's Liberation Army Special Operations Forces

Production history
- Designer: Norinco
- Designed: 2000s
- Produced: 2011–present
- No. built: At least 50,000 as of Jan, 2018

Specifications
- Mass: 4.27 kg (9.4 lb) (Empty, less optics); 5 kg (11 lb) (Loaded, less optics); Up to 7 kg (15 lb) (Full system)
- Length: 950 mm (37 in)
- Cartridge: 5.8×42mm DBP-10 bullet (KE); 20×28B DQL-12 grenade (HE)
- Action: Gas-operated, rotating bolt (rifle section); Bolt action (launcher section)
- Muzzle velocity: 220 m/s (720 ft/s) (HE)
- Effective firing range: 800 m (2,600 ft) (HE)
- Feed system: 30 round detachable box magazine (KE); Single-shot (HE)
- Sights: fire control system with laser range finder (Integral) electronic-optic sight with high definition camera (Optional) fiber-optic transmitted single-eye goggle (Optional)

The Type 11 (Chinese: 11式单兵综合作战系统; pinyin: 11 Shì dānbīng zònghé zuòzhàn xìtǒng; lit. 'Type 11 individual integrated combat system'), designated as QTS-11, is an air burst grenade launcher integrated with the QBZ-03 assault rifle in service with the Chinese military since 2015. It later received designation QDS-121.

== History ==
The first pictures of the supposed rifles were shown as prototypes in 2006 and 2008. Reporting on the weapon as early as February 2011 initially identified the weapon as the ZH-05.

In early 2018, Chinese state media announced the introduction of the weapon with the Sky Wolf Commando Unit, a PLA Special Operations Forces unit from the Western Theater Command. It was also reported to be issued with the 76th Special Operations Brigade, 76th Group Army.

The QTS-11 was reportedly used overseas during anti-pirate operations in the Gulf of Aden. It was observed in limited service as of the 2025 China-Cambodia military exercise.

== Design ==
The QTS-11 system combines the QBZ-03 assault rifle with a 20 mm airburst grenade launcher and weighs between 5–7 kg (11–15 lb) when fully loaded. It can use magazines from the QBZ-95 and the QBZ-03. It is 93 cm long and weighs 4.27 kg.

The primary weapon of the system is the 20 mm grenade launcher, with the 5.8 mm rifle for secondary use. Grenades are pre-programmed through electronic sight with fire control system and loaded manually through bolt-action. Five types of grenade rounds available: impact detonation, airburst, armor-piercing, improved fragmentation, and shotgun-type rounds. A four-position fire-mode selector lets the operator switch between the rifle and grenade component. The fire modes in sequence are single, auto, grenade, and safety. The U.S. encountered problems with the lethality of small 20 mm grenades during OICW development, resulting in a switch to larger 25 mm grenades for the XM25. The PLA claims their grenades have less electronics in them to carry more explosives and fragments to cause adequate wounding capability. The grenades are reportedly capable of a 7.7 m (25 ft) damage radius and an 800 m (0.50 mi) range with 220 m/s muzzle velocity.

The QTS-11 can be equipped with an additional eyepiece device mounted on the helmet, allowing soldiers to shoot around corners. The video image will be streaming from the electronic sight to the single-eye goggle. The fire-control system can also be turned off for manual sighting without the airburst programming capability.

Unlike other nations' airburst weapons, the QTS-11 has a single-shot grenade launcher that requires each round to be manually loaded and reloaded after every firing, while the others are magazine fed. Initial PLA trials determined that a single-shot grenade launcher would make it easier to change the type of munitions fired. The QTS-11 does not use multi-purpose munitions; instead, it uses different munition types, which reduce the electronics required and increase the firepower of the munitions. Additionally, only the laser range finder and fire control system are integrated with the weapon, leaving optics optional and modular. These changes make it the lightest and least capable of all the airburst weapons in its base configuration.

Weapon	Empty Weight	Loaded Weight	Rifle ammunition	Grenade ammunition	Cost
QTS11	4.27 kg (9.4 lb) (less optics)	Up to 7 kg (15 lb)	30 rounds 5.8×42 mm	1 round 20×28B mm	Not known
XM29	6.8 kg (15 lb)	8.2 kg (18 lb)	30 rounds 5.56×45 mm	5 rounds 20×28mm mm	US$12,000
XM25	5.45 kg (12 lbs)	6.35 kg (14.0 lb)	none	5 rounds 25×40mm mm	US$25,000-$35,000
K11	6.1 kg (13 lb)	7.2 kg (16 lb)	30 rounds 5.56×45 mm	5 rounds 20×30mm mm	US$14,000

== Users ==
- China

== See also ==
- XM29 OICW – (United States)
- XM25 CDTE – (Germany, United States)
- S&T Daewoo K11 – (South Korea)
- Advanced Individual Combat Weapon – (Australia)
- PAPOP – (France)
