= Heckler & Koch XM8 =

Prototype rifle developed for the US Army

XM8
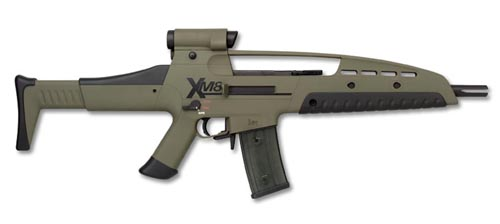
- An early version of the XM8
- Type: Rifle; Automatic rifle; Light machine gun; Sniper rifle/Designated marksman rifle; Personal defense weapon
- Place of origin: Germany; United States

Service history
- In service: 2010–present
- Used by: Royal Malaysian Navy

Production history
- Designed: 2002
- Manufacturer: Heckler & Koch; Alliant Techsystems
- Produced: 2003–present
- Variants: See Variants

Specifications
- Mass: 3.4 kg (7.5 lb)
- Length: 840 mm (33 in)
- Barrel length: 320 mm (12.5 in)
- Cartridge: 5.56×45mm NATO
- Action: Gas-operated, rotating bolt
- Rate of fire: 750 rounds/min
- Muzzle velocity: approx. 900 m/s (see variants)
- Effective firing range: 500 m (550 yd)
- Feed system: 30-round detachable box magazine, 100-round C-Mag drum magazine
- Sights: ISM-V Unmagnified reflex sight (4x for DMR variant)

The Heckler & Koch XM8 is a lightweight infantry rifle system developed from the late 1990s to early 2000s. The rifle was designed by German small arms manufacturer Heckler & Koch (H&K), and shares design and engineering with their G36 assault rifle.

The XM8 design was originally part of the Objective Individual Combat Weapon program (OICW), which was developing a "smart" grenade launcher system with an underslung carbine rifle. The system was unable to meet performance and weight requirements and was eventually canceled. In the aftermath, the two portions of the OICW were separated, resulting in the XM8 and XM25 projects.

While the XM8 was being considered by the United States Army as a potential standard infantry rifle to replace the M4 carbine, this project was put on hold in April 2005, and was formally canceled on October 31 of that year after it failed field testing. The Heckler & Koch XM8 was adopted by the Royal Malaysian Navy for its PASKAL special forces. In April 2026, the U.S. Army accepted delivery of the first batch of an unrelated carbine of the same designation, the SIG XM8.

== History ==
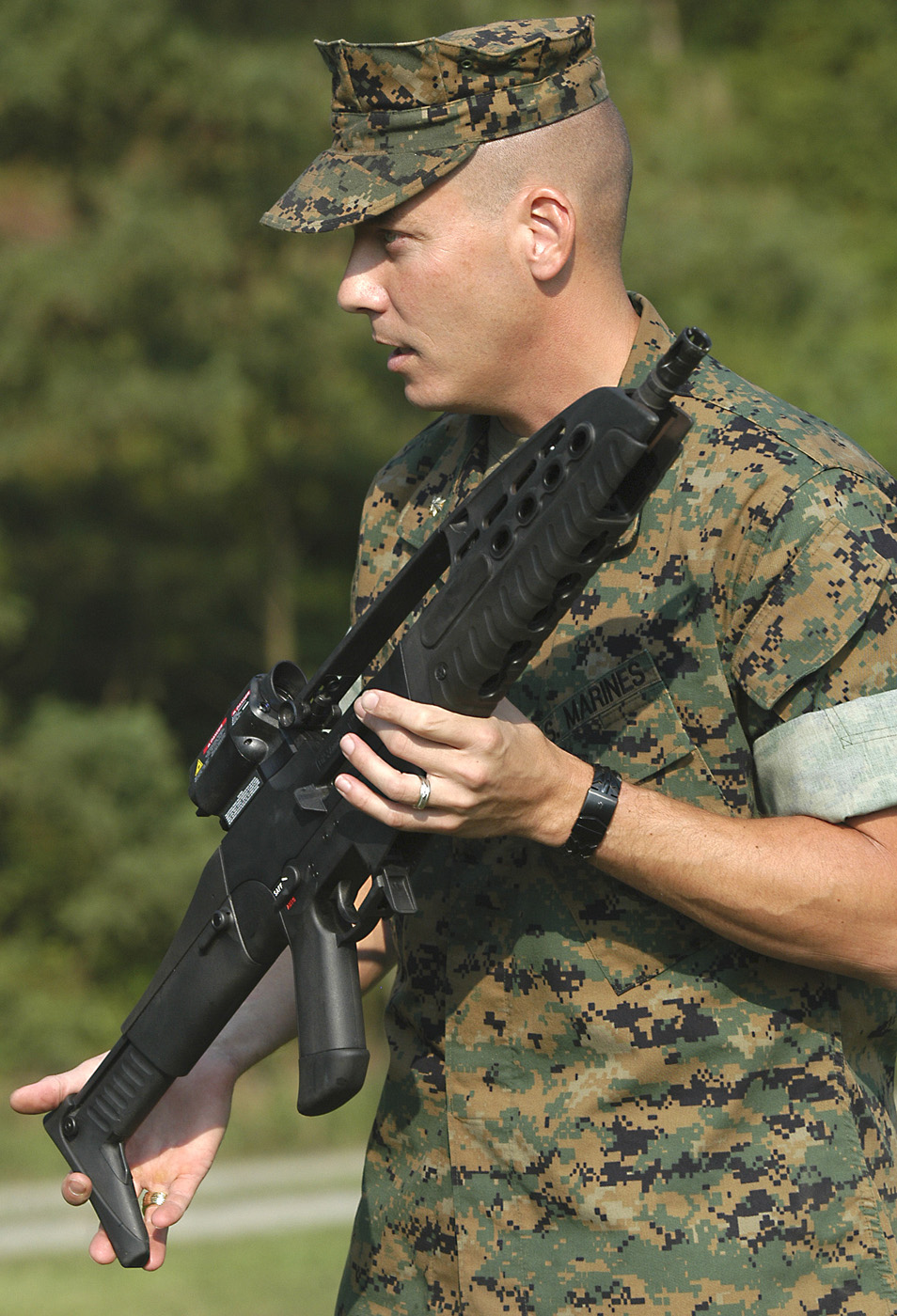
A U.S. Marine Corps weapons instructor presents an XM8 Carbine during the Infantry Operations Chief Symposium in August 2005.

The U.S. Army's purpose in contracting for this prototype weapon was to provide replacement options for the M16 rifle after the XM29 program ran into problems. The goal was a weapon that was cheaper, lighter, and more effective than the M16 and M4 series of weapons. The XM8 was not just one weapon but a system which could be reconfigured with appropriate parts to be any one of several variants, from a short-barreled personal defense weapon to a bipod-equipped support weapon. It also included an integrated optical sight and IR laser aiming module/illuminator.

The XM8 was based on the rifle module of Alliant Techsystems's XM29 OICW project, of which the weapon mechanisms were the responsibility of H&K. Following the indefinite delay of the Objective Individual Combat Weapon program, the U.S. Army requested that the contractors design stand-alone weapons from the XM29's kinetic energy and high explosive modules.

The first 30 XM8 prototypes were delivered by November 2003 for preliminary testing. Later, at least 200 developmental prototypes were procured. Among the complaints raised during testing were ergonomics issues and the battery life being too low for the weapon's powered optics. Two other key issues were reducing the weapon's weight and increasing the heat resistance of the polymer handguard, which would start to melt under sustained fire. The main testing was largely completed, and the army pushed for funding for a large field test. However, in 2004 Congress denied $26 million funding for 7,000 rifles to do a wide scale test fielding of the XM8 in 2005. At that time, the rifle still had developmental goals that were incomplete, primarily associated with the weapon's weight; the battery life had been extended, and a more heat-resistant plastic handguard added. The earliest product brochure lists the target weight for the carbine variant at 2.6 kg (5.7 lb) with the then current prototype at 2.8 kg (6.2 lb). The weight of the carbine prototype had since grown to 3.4 kg (7.5 lb) according to a brochure released by HK and General Dynamics in January 2005.

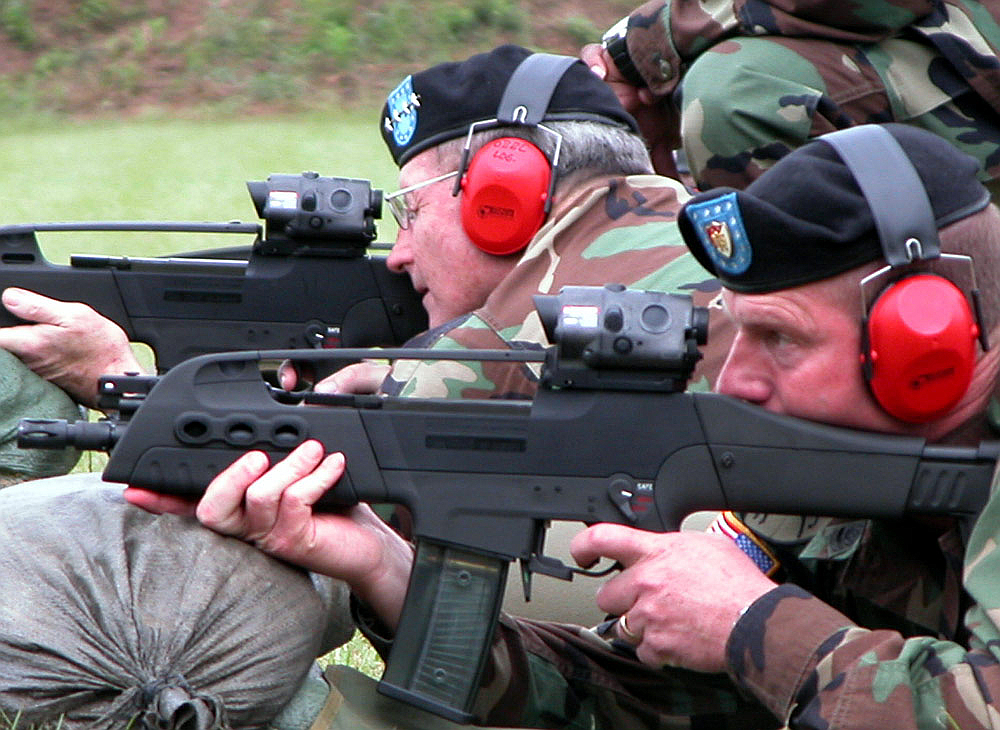
U.S. Army leaders test fire the compact set-up of the XM8 at Fort Benning, Georgia in August 2004.

During the same period, the Army came under pressure from other arms makers to open up the XM8 to competition. The main argument was that the weapon that was being adopted was a substantially different system than for the original competition that ATK and H&K had actually won (see XM29). Other issues identified were that the army has a legislated obligation to prefer U.S.-based manufacturers, and that a previous agreement with Colt Defense required the army to involve Colt in certain small-arms programs. The XM8 program was put on hold in 2004. The exact reason why this happened is a matter of debate; some combination of the aforementioned technical issues, funding restrictions, and outside pressure being involved.

In 2005, the Army issued a formal Request for Proposals (RFP) for the OICW Increment One family of weapons. This RFP gave manufacturers six months to develop and deliver prototype weapons with requirements very similar to the XM8 capabilities, but with the addition of a squad automatic weapon (SAW) configuration. No XM8 prototypes have been shown that actually match the capabilities of the M249 (e.g. fast barrel replacement, high sustained rate of fire, belt feed). The OICW Increment One requirement for the SAW includes fast barrel replacement and high sustained rate of fire, but leaves the ammunition feed choice up to the manufacturer.

Funding for the M320 grenade launcher, a single-shot under-barrel grenade launcher similar to the M203 that was originally intended for the XM8, was approved. The launcher is heavier than the M203, but does offer some advantages, such as not needing special mounting hardware and loading from the side instead of the bottom, which enables use of longer-than-standard grenades. The XM320 was designed for use with the existing inventory of M16s and M4s and is also compatible with the XM8. It can also be used as a stand-alone weapon.

As of July 19, 2005, the OICW Increment One RFP was put on an eight-week hold, with an indication given that the program was being restructured as a joint procurement program. On October 31, 2005, the OICW Increment One RFP was cancelled.

In an article in Jane's Defence Weekly, April 26, 2006 (Vol 43, page 30) it is stated that "The US Army has again delayed the procurement of its future infantry weapons, this time for more than five years, and is working to field two interim guns in the meantime".

General Dynamics was involved in latter stages and H&K had plans to produce the rifle at a plant in Georgia. H&K was British-owned at the start of the project, but was later bought back by a group of German investors. Engineering work was done at facilities in the United States and Germany.

=== Near cancellation ===
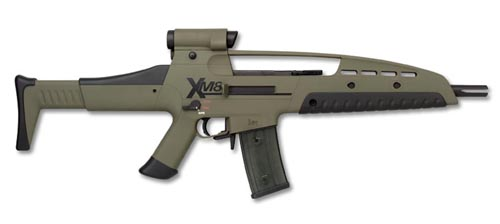
A prototype XM8 carbine - lacking PCAP device on the side rails. Also has the open 'duckbill' rather than 'birdcage' style flash suppressor

The U.S. military's XM8 program was almost canceled in the autumn of 2005 after being suspended earlier that year, but was limited to the use of Marines. Had this program not been specified, the XM8 system may have faced competition from weapons such as from the FN SCAR, Bushmaster ACR and HK416. It was later altered and entered as a candidate for the SCAR competition but was unsuccessful.

=== Further testing ===
In autumn 2007 the XM8 was compared to other firearms in a 'dust test'. The competition was based on two previous tests that were conducted in summer 2006 and summer 2007 before the latest test in the autumn of 2007. In the summer 2007 test, M16 rifles and M4 carbines recorded a total of 307 stoppages. In the autumn 2007 test, the XM8 recorded only 127 stoppages in 60,000 total rounds while the M4 carbine had 882. The FN SCAR had 226 stoppages and the HK416 had 233. The difference between the XM8, HK416, and FN SCAR was not statistically significant when correcting for the less reliable STANAG magazine. However, the discrepancy of 575 stoppages between the summer and autumn 2007 tests of the M4 had officials looking into possible causes for the change such as different officials, seasons, and inadequate sample pool size but have stated that the conditions of the test were ostensibly the same.

== Design ==
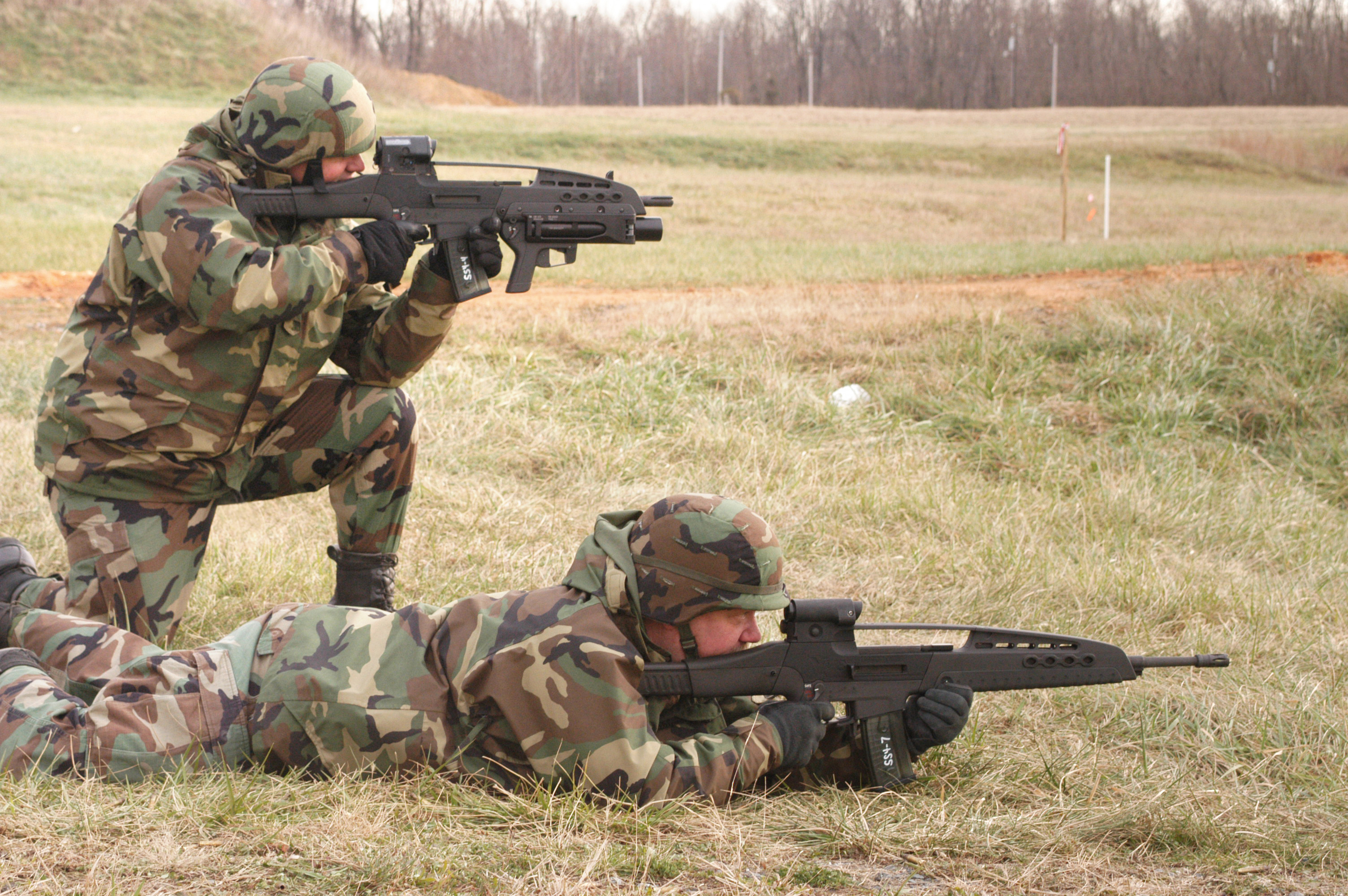
XM8 testing; One shooter is kneeling with an XM8 Carbine and a XM320 (a 40 mm grenade launcher) attached, while the other uses the XM8 sharpshooter (designated marksman) variant.

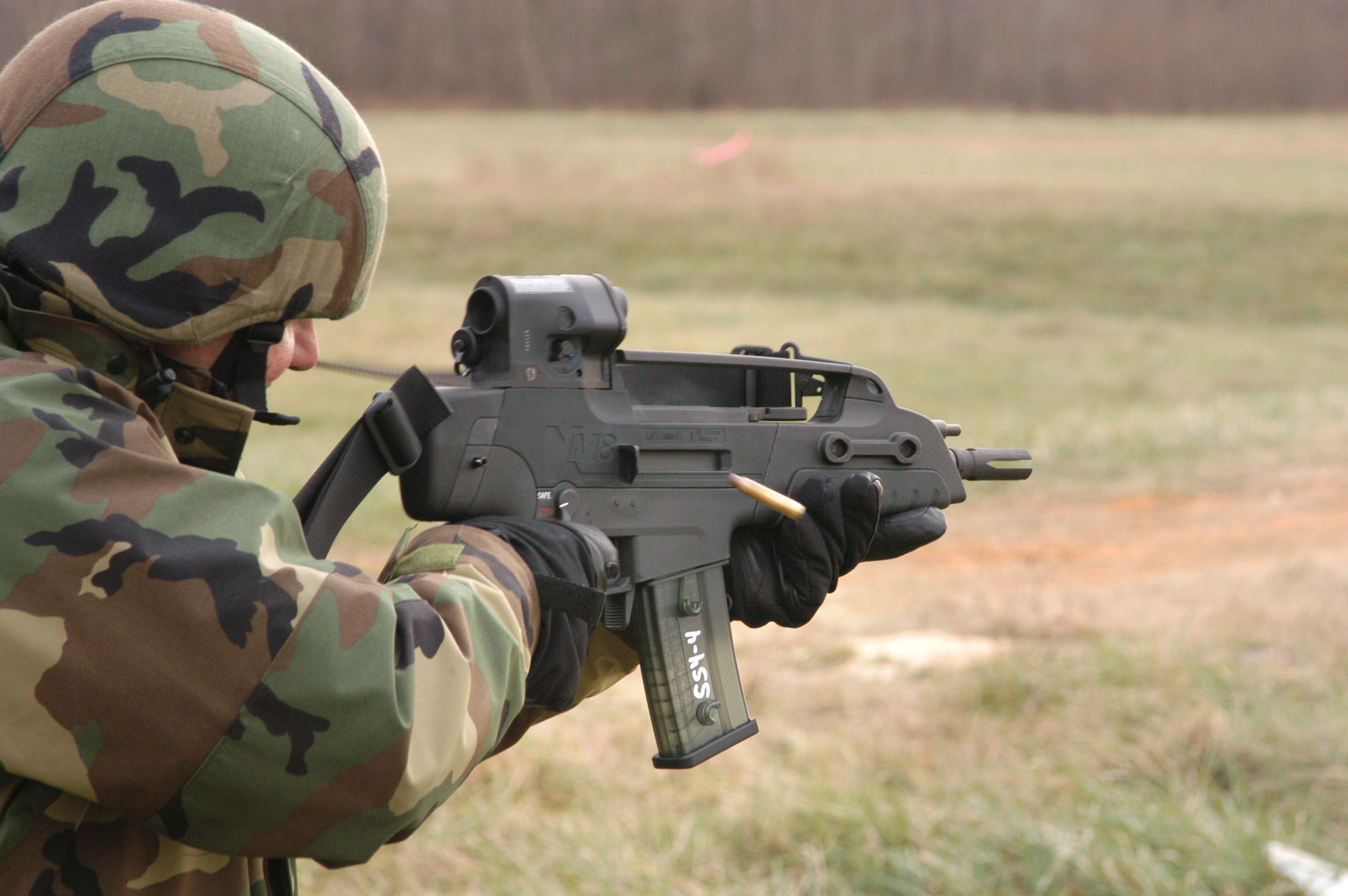
An XM8 compact carbine variant with buttcap attached, fired by a U.S. Army weapons tester.

The XM8 is a selective-fire 5.56mm rifle, firing from a closed rotating bolt. Its design and functioning is similar to that of the Heckler & Koch G36 assault rifle from which it is derived.

=== Materials and weight ===
The materials used to build the XM8 are almost entirely composites, with the notable exception of the cold-hammer-forged steel barrel. Preliminary tests in desert and arctic conditions have shown the XM8 to be a rugged weapon, though some complaints arose concerning an unspecified mechanical issue and melting handguards due to overheating when firing full-auto.

Much of the expected cost and weight savings are from the weapon's electronic sight. The baseline XM8 carbine (with its integrated sight), for example, can be compared to an M4 carbine with a host of previous-generation electronic add-ons like the AN/PEQ-2, Aimpoint CompM2, Advanced Combat Optical Gunsight, and/or BUIS. Without the advantage of the next-generation combined electronics sight, the XM8 would be both heavier and more expensive than the firearms it was intended to replace.

=== Accessories ===
The XM8 abandoned the standard Picatinny rail for attachment of weapon accessories, in favor of a new standard referred to as PCAP (Picatinny Combat Attachment Points), small oval holes on the forward grip. (A variant was designed with MIL-STD-1913 rails — XM8 R; and some early XM8 prototypes had rails.) PCAP is not backwards compatible with currently fielded attachments that use MIL-STD-1913 rails without using an adapter. The benefit of PCAP, however, is the precision of the accessory's connection with the body of the weapon; accessories utilizing Picatinny rails often need adjustment if they are removed and reattached. Additionally, most standard accessory functionality is built into the XM8. Where functionality was missing, it was anticipated that accessories would be redesigned to utilize PCAP. In the new OICW Increment One competition, the army has left the choice of attachment technology up to the manufacturer, with requirements built into the RFP as to the ability of sights to maintain their zero.

The M4 carbine barrel is 368 mm (14.5 in) and the XM8 barrel is 317 mm (12.5 in) but the rifles have the same overall length. Although a shorter barrel generally results in lower muzzle velocity, Polygonal rifling partially compensates for the loss of velocity from a shorter barrel. An electronic round counter was proposed for the XM8. The system would have tracked the number of rounds fired and the date and time of each shot. The data would then be accessed wirelessly by a device like a PDA. Another benefit would be to monitor unauthorized weapon use or corroborate field reports. Other features included completely ambidextrous controls and an integrated red dot/3x optical zoom scope (later changed to a red dot/1x sight). However the designated marksman configuration used a 3.5x magnification scope.

== Variants ==
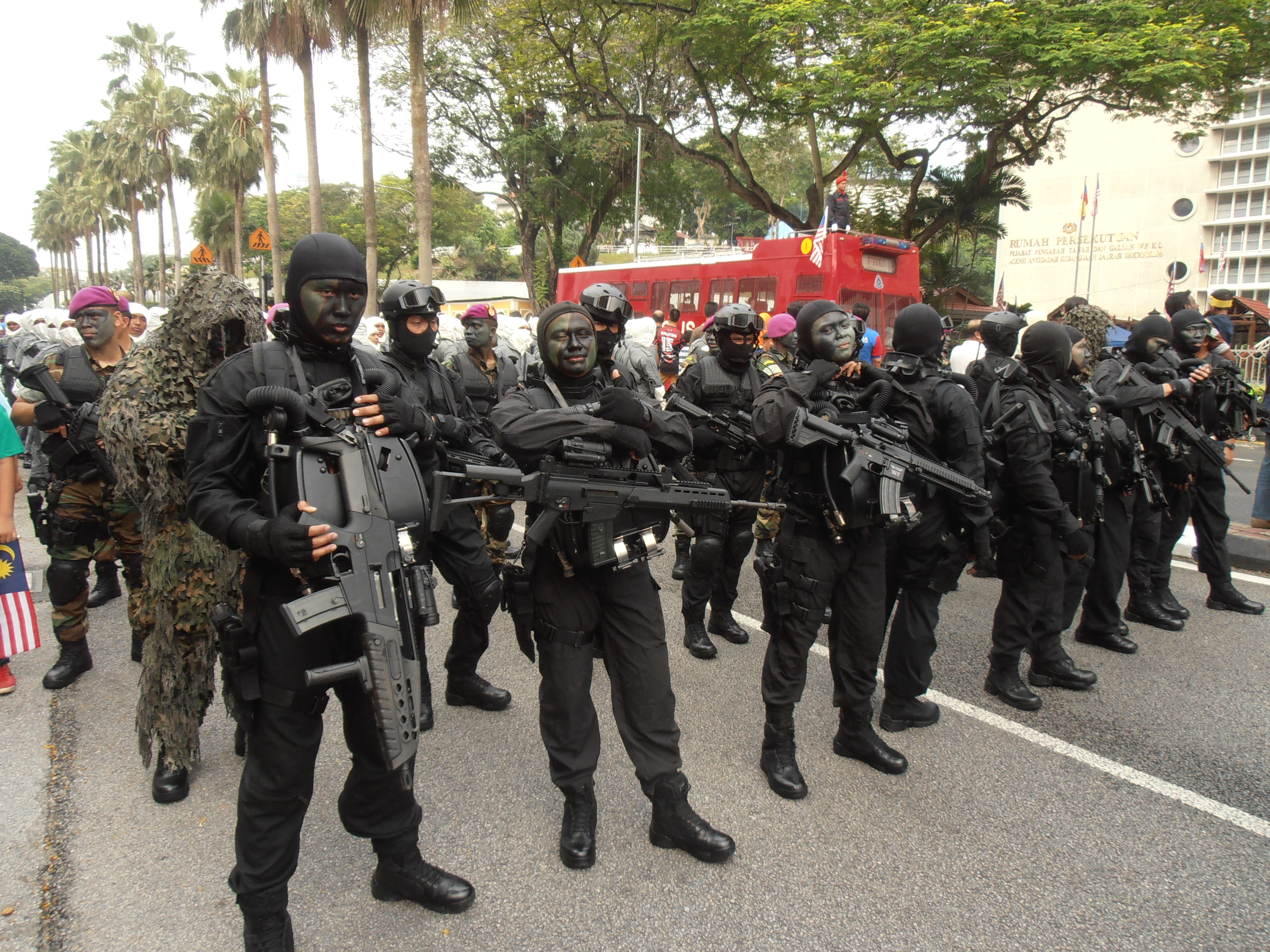
Navy PASKAL operators on standby during 57th National Day Parade Of Malaysia. Sailor at left holds an XM8.

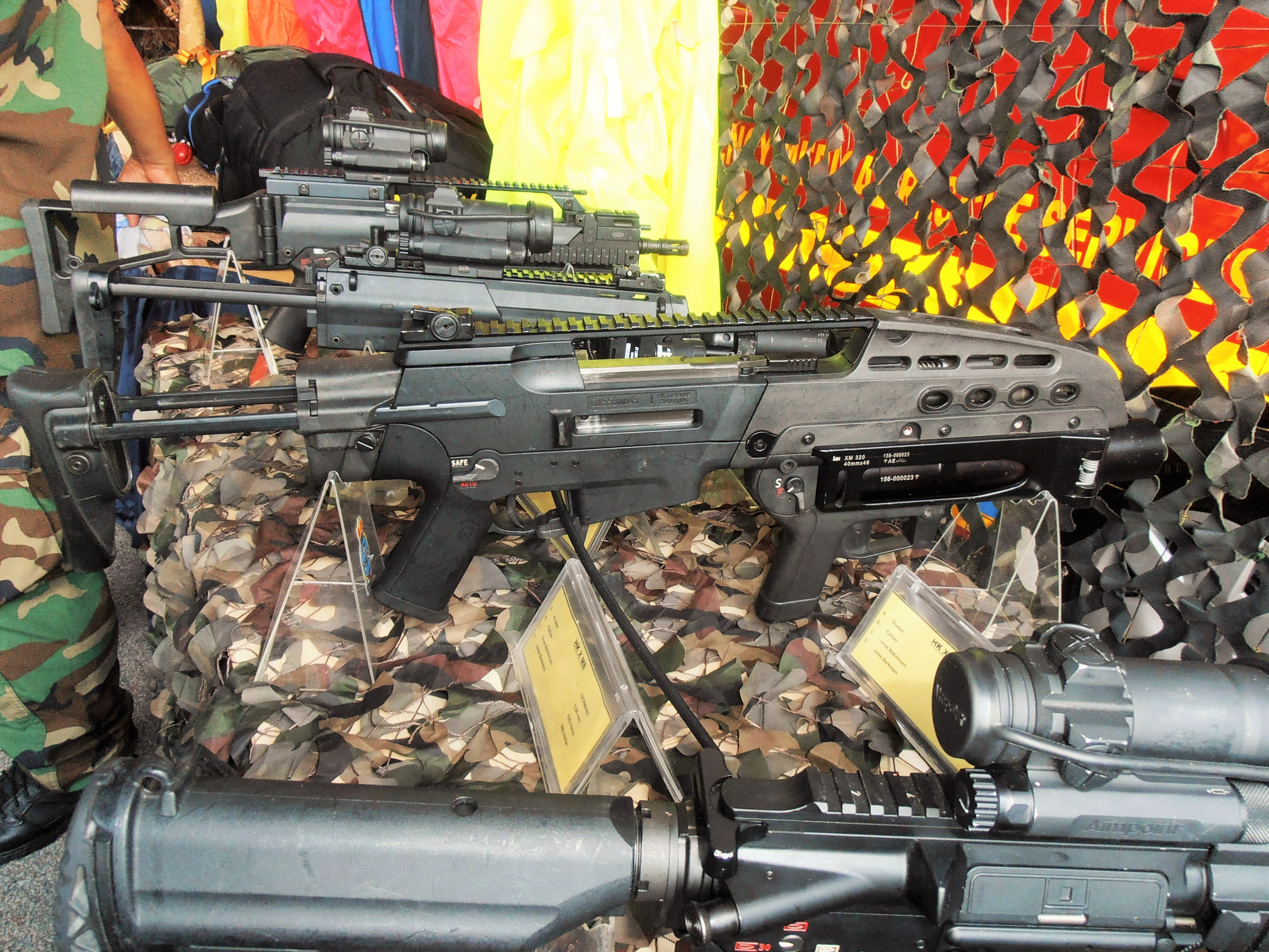
H&K XM8 Carbine attached with H&K AG36 Underbarrel Grenade Launcher of Royal Malaysian Navy's special forces, PASKAL.

For much of its life, four different models were proposed: a compact PDW (personal defense weapon) with a 241 mm (9.5 in) barrel, a carbine with a 317 mm (12.5 in) barrel, a sniper and automatic rifle variant, both with 508 mm (20 in) barrels. In addition a Light machine gun with a 100-round dual drum Beta C-Mag is proposed. Accessories such as optical sights, a grenade launcher, and a bipod were integrated using a new system which allows for precision attachment (so that, for example, scopes do not have to be readjusted each time they are attached). Like the M4 and M16, the XM8 was chambered for the standard 5.56×45mm NATO round and was normally equipped with a 30-round plastic box magazine also used in the G36. Although, this meant that the magazine housing was not compatible with M4 and M16's metal STANAG magazine without using an adaptor. A 100-round dual drum Beta C-Mag style magazine could also be used.

One of the XM8's unique features was its modularity. In addition to attachments mentioned above, this modularity allowed for quick repairs, barrel length changes, and even caliber changes in the field. Along with its basic components, the XM8 would have complemented the XM29, with such features as identical accessory mounts.

The number and type of variants in the family varied over its lifetime, this overview with three main versions is based from a press release in the early 2000s.

- XM8 compact carbine: 229 mm (9 in) barrel, PDW configuration, collapsing stock or buttcap; muzzle velocity 720 m/s (2,362 ft/s)
- XM8 carbine with XM320 grenade launcher: 317 mm (12.5 in) barrel; muzzle velocity 815 m/s (2,674 ft/s)
- Automatic rifle: 508 mm (20 in) barrel, with muzzle velocity 916 m/s (3,005 ft/s)
- Designated marksman rifle: 508 mm (20 in) barrel, integrated folding bipod, 4X sight, 30/100-round magazine; with muzzle velocity 916 m/s (3,005 ft/s)
- Light machine gun: heavy 508 mm (20 in) barrel with integrated folding bipod, rate of fire from 600–750 rounds/min

== Usage ==
While the XM8 fell out of favor with the U.S. Armed Forces, Heckler & Koch sought to market the rifle globally. In the meantime, the Malaysian Armed Forces expressed interest in using the rifle and by 2007 openly stated its intention to purchase the XM8 rifle. By 2010, the Royal Malaysian Navy special unit PASKAL began using the XM8 along with other Heckler & Koch rifles including the HK416 and G36.

== See also ==
- Adaptive Combat Rifle, modular rifle system.
- AN-94
- Barrett REC7
- Beretta ARX160
- FN SCAR
- XM25 CDTE
- XM7
