= 80.002 =

- Type: Assault Rifle; Grenade Launcher
- Place of origin: Soviet Union

Production history
- Designer: Yu.V. Minaev; V.I. Chelikin; G.A. Yanov
- Designed: 1975–1979

Specifications
- Mass: 4.9 kg (without ammo)
- Length: 1000 mm
- Barrel length: 415 mm
- Cartridge: 5.45×39mm 12.7 mm Grenade
- Caliber: 5.45 mm 12.7 mm
- Barrels: 2
- Action: Gas
- Maximum firing range: 1000 m
- Feed system: 30 round AK-74 compatible magazine / 10 round 12.7 mm compatible magazine
- Sights: Iron

The 80.002 was a combined assault rifle and grenade launcher prototype based on the AK-74. The weapon was developed at TsNIITochMash by Yu.V. Minaev, V.I. Chelikin, and G.A. Yanov between 1975 and 1979. The main difference from the Kalashnikov is the presence of two adjacent barrels of 5.45 mm and 12.7 mm respectively. The thickness of the receiver was double that of an AK-74. The 80.002 was not accepted for service.

== See also ==
- GP-25
- Objective Individual Combat Weapon program
- Daewoo K11
- List of Russian weaponry
- TKB-059
