= Advanced Individual Combat Weapon =

Advanced Infantry Combat Weapon
- Type: Bullpup assault rifle with grenade launcher module
- Place of origin: Australia

Production history
- Designer: Defence Science and Technology Organisation; Metal Storm; Tenix Defence Systems
- Designed: 2001/2002 (CTD Approved) - 2006 (Project End)
- No. built: 3

Specifications
- Mass: 6.48 kg (14.3 lb) (unloaded); 7.88 kg (17.4 lb) (loaded w/o sight); 9.9 kg (22 lb) (loaded with sight)
- Length: 738 mm (29.1 in)
- Barrel length: 450 mm (18 in) (Rifle Section)
- Cartridge: 5.56×45mm NATO; 40mm proprietary grenades
- Action: Gas operated, Rotating bolt (Rifle Section); Superposed, electrically fired (Grenade Launcher)
- Rate of fire: 650 rpm (Rifle Section)
- Muzzle velocity: 950 m/s (3,100 ft/s) (Rifle Section); 95 m/s (310 ft/s) (Grenade Launcher)
- Effective firing range: 500 m (550 yd) (Rifle Section); 300 m (330 yd) (Grenade Launcher)
- Feed system: 30-round detachable box magazine 3-round superposed barrel (grenades)
- Sights: ITL Viper Multi-Purpose Rifle System; Vingsight FCS

The Advanced Individual Combat Weapon (AICW) was an Australian prototype combination assault rifle and grenade launcher developed as a technology demonstrator. The AICW combined a standard 5.56 mm assault rifle based on the successful F88 Austeyr with a superposed load grenade launcher developed by Metal Storm.

== History ==
The AICW was developed by the Defence Science and Technology Organisation (DSTO) in alliance with Metal Storm and Tenix Defence Systems, receiving funding primarily through the Australian Government's Capability and Technology Demonstrator (CTD) program. Funding was provided for the development of several prototypes, including grenade launchers chambered in both 20mm and 40mm.

Live fire demonstrations of the AICW VX3 took place in the summer of 2005.

The weapon was not intended to enter service, but rather as a concept demonstration to "generate ‘advance-thinking’ within the ADF about the future of small arms". As such, development of the AICW ceased following successful final demonstrations and the completion of the CTD program.

== Design ==
The AICW aimed to provide the infantryman with the ability to fire multiple grenades without having to reload, and to switch between 5.56 mm rounds and 40 mm grenades without changing sights, trigger or stance, giving the operator more versatility and reduced reaction times in combat.

The weapon did not use Metal Storm's preloaded superposed barrel system, instead using proprietary 40 mm grenade rounds designed to fit nose-to-tail to form a superposed-load stack similar to their 3GL grenade launcher. This meant the grenade launcher was loaded in a similar manner to the tube magazine of a pump-action shotgun: an induction coil around the barrel was used to provide ignition. The grenades were of a similar pseudo-caseless design to the Russian VOG-25, with the whole grenade being fired as a projectile with the propellant chamber still attached. As a result, there was no requirement for a mechanical action to eject spent grenade casings.

This made the weapon more compact and significantly lighter, though some available figures suggest the completed weapon would have been heavier than the XM29 OICW. Figures for the tested variant are somewhat lighter, with the DSTO Scientific Officer in charge of the AICW CTD, Stephen Forbes, stating that a production version could have weighed as little as 7.5 kg fully loaded, after a predicted 380g weight reduction from the VX3 prototype. The bullpup layout of AICW's 5.56mm component meant it benefited from a longer rifle barrel than OICW's KE module, which attracted significant criticism prior to cancellation for the poor effectiveness of its 250mm barrel. According to Forbes, the explosive radius of the 40 mm grenade rounds was also considered to be superior to that of the 20×28mm, another heavily-criticized aspect of the OICW, and the comparative reduction in range deemed acceptable in return for superior terminal affects.

The AICW, not including sights or ammunition, would have represented an increase in weight of around 20% compared to the M203-equipped F88GLA in service with the ADF at the time. In return, the AICW offered a 25% higher grenade velocity and recoil mitigation for follow-up fire.

== See also ==
- XM29 OICW
- S&T Daewoo K11
- QTS-11
- List of bullpup firearms
- List of assault rifles
