= Multi Caliber Individual Weapon System =

Multi Calibre Individual Weapon System
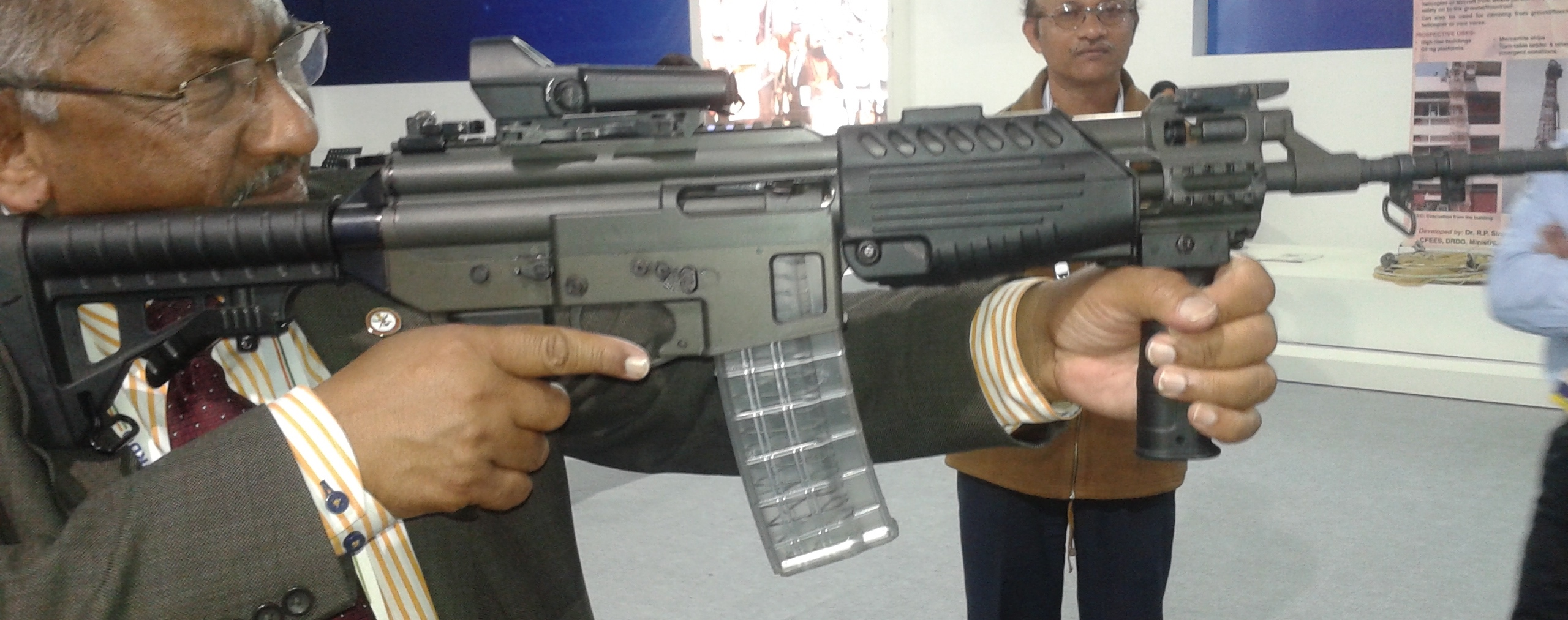
- Type: Assault rifle
- Place of origin: India

Production history
- Designed: 2015–present
- Manufacturer: Armament Research and Development Establishment; Ordnance Factory Tiruchirappalli
- No. built: 6 Preproduction prototypes

Specifications
- Mass: 3.5 kg (7.7 lb) (empty); 4 kg (8.8 lb) (loaded with magazine)
- Length: 910 mm (36 in) (including butt)
- Cartridge: 5.56×45mm NATO; 7.62×39mm 6.8mm Remington SPC
- Action: Gas-operated, rotating bolt
- Rate of fire: 600-650 rpm
- Muzzle velocity: 715–890 m/s (2,350–2,920 ft/s)
- Effective firing range: 700 meters
- Feed system: 30-round detachable box magazines
- Sights: Iron sights, various day and night optical sight

Multi Calibre Individual Weapon System (MCIWS) is an assault rifle developed in India by the Armament Research and Development Establishment, a laboratory of the Defence Research and Development Organisation. It was first seen at the DEFEXPO 2014 exhibition.

As of 2015, the rifle is also known as the Advanced Automatic Rifle (AAR) and also as the F-INSAS rifle.

== History ==
The Indian Army chose an indigenous assault rifle to replace the INSAS rifle currently in service. The decision, which could save money in foreign exchange and boost local manufacture, was made by the former Chief of Army Staff, General Dalbir Singh Suhag. Several rifles are currently undergoing small arms trials with three prototype rifles made for testing as a future replacement to the INSAS rifle.

The MCIWS has also found interest with the Indian paramilitary forces including the Border Security Force, Central Reserve Police Force, Indo-Tibetan Border Police and the Sashastra Seema Bal.

According to a DRDO September 18, 2018 newsletter, the MCIWS is now ready for serial production.

In October 2017, the MCIWS procurement was superseded by an Army process to acquire around 7 lakh 7.62mm calibre rifles.

== Design ==
The MCIWS is configured to fire in 5.56×45mm NATO, 7.62×39mm and in 6.8mm Remington SPC. Its design is influenced by both the AR-15 and the FN FNC. The barrel assembly appears to be based on the AK-47.

The design would allow soldiers to configure it according to the needs of the missions by changing rifle barrels. The MCIWS uses a gas-operated short stroke piston design, and uses 30-round plastic-type magazines. The rifle also has ambidextrous features, such as the charging lever and magazine release. The MCIWS includes an indigenous under barrel grenade launcher to fire airburst-type grenades which can take out targets up to 500 meters. Various sights can be mounted on the Picatinny rail on the upper receiver.

The rifle is of aluminium alloy and features a modular, rivet-less design.
