= S&T Daewoo K11 =

K11
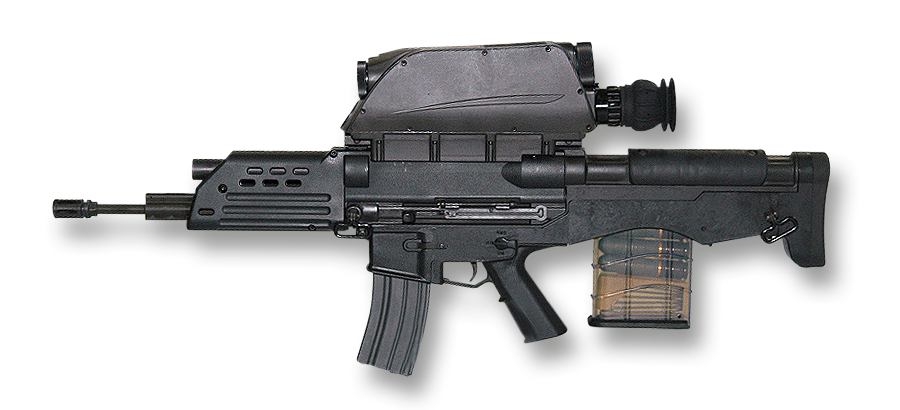
- The XK11 rifle with 20mm HEAB and 5.56mm KE
- Type: Bullpup dual-barrel airburst multi-weapon
- Place of origin: South Korea

Service history
- In service: 2010–2019
- Wars: War in Afghanistan

Production history
- Designer: Agency for Defense Development; S&T Motiv; EO System; Poongsan Corporation; Hansung ILS
- Designed: 2000-2008
- Manufacturer: S&T Motiv
- Unit cost: US$14,000
- Produced: 2010-present

Specifications
- Mass: 6.1 kg (13.45 lb) empty
- Length: 860 mm (33.86 in)
- Barrel length: 310 mm (12 in) (KE); 405 mm (15.9 in) (HE)
- Cartridge: 5.56×45mm NATO (KE); 20×30mm grenade (HE)
- Caliber: 5.56 mm (KE); 20 mm (HE)
- Action: Gas-operated, rotating bolt (rifle section); Bolt action (launcher section)
- Rate of fire: 700 RPM (KE)
- Muzzle velocity: 960 m/s (3,100 ft/s) (KE); 200 m/s (660 ft/s) (HE)
- Effective firing range: 300 m (KE); 500 m (HE)
- Feed system: STANAG Magazines (KE); 5-round detachable box magazine (HE)
- Sights: Ballistics computer, day (optical)/night (thermal vision) vision sight

The S&T Daewoo K11 DAW (Dual-barrel Air-burst Weapon) is a combination infantry firearm, resembling the earlier US Objective Individual Combat Weapon in concept, design, and operation, consisting of two separate weapons combined into a single unit: a lower assault rifle chambered to fire 5.56×45mm NATO rounds and an upper 20×30mm (caliber of shell x length of propellent case) grenade launcher firing both conventional and air-bursting "smart" grenades, along with its integrated digital sighting unit.

== History ==
The K11 was officially unveiled to the public at the DSEI military expo, though information pertaining to its development has been available since 2006.

The weapon was adopted by the Republic of Korea Armed Forces in 2008 and was distributed within the Republic of Korea Army during 2010, making it the world's first army to use an airburst rifle as standard issue in the military. Each squad is reported to be issued two K11s, though it will not replace grenadiers who currently use K2 rifles with the underslung K201 grenade launcher.

In May 2010, the United Arab Emirates purchased a quantity of 40 K11s for evaluation purposes for a total cost of US$560,000, giving an indicative unit cost of US$14,000.

In March 2011 it was announced that 15 out of 39 K11s issued since June 2010 (including 7 out of 20 rifles used by Korean forces in Afghanistan) had shown serious defects and the decision had been made to halt production and modify the design. The defects included: barrel movements during firing, defects in the striking mechanism, condensation forming inside the laser reception lens, and defects in switching from single to automatic fire. South Korea's state procurement agency, the Defense Acquisition Program Administration (DAPA) said it has fixed the defects by modifying the designs and improving the shooting control system and will resume its production.

By 2013 4,000 K11s were under production, with expectation that they would be in service by the following year.

In September 2014, a major defect was found in the fire control system of the K11, which suspended production as well as use of the 900 rifles distributed to the Army. The Agency for Defense Development said a solution would be implemented before the end of 2016.

In 2017, the 2nd gen K11 was revealed with improvements for its weight and 20mm grenade firepower.

On 4 December 2019, the project was officially cancelled, due to a lack of accuracy and various defects.

== Design ==
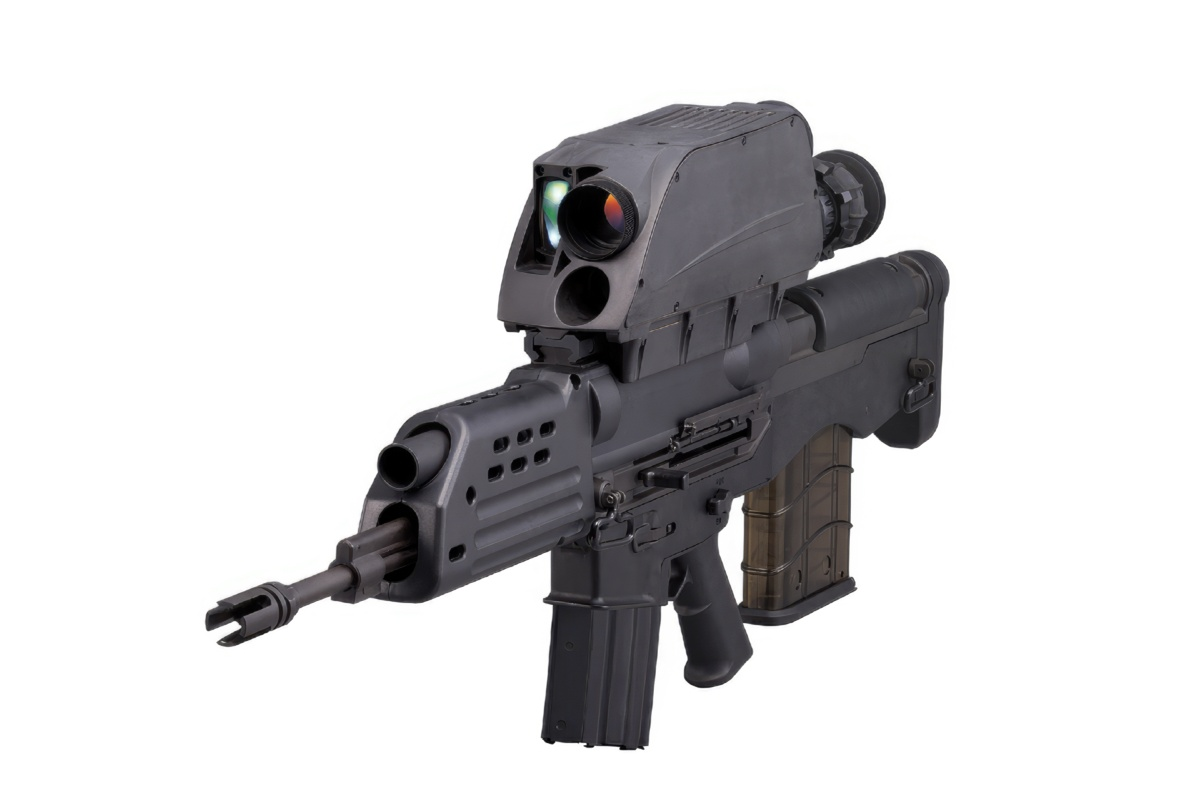
Front view of the K11 rifle

Equipped with a laser range-finder as well as a ballistics computer, the K11 allows the operator to quickly find the distance to a target and launch an airburst shell. The shell will then detonate a few meters away from the target. An electronic scope is integrated on the K11; it can be linked to a goggle system with a digital display. The display can be used during nighttime with thermal imaging, and shows the range information from the laser range-finder. The weapon is compatible with standard 20- or 30-round 5.56×45mm NATO magazines, and can hold 6-round magazines of 20 mm shells at one time.

The fire selector position and layout is similar to the M16/M4 rifles' selector, though some controls are different. It has four positions, three of which are: 9 o'clock for safe; 6 o'clock for three-round burst for the rifle; and 3 o'clock for semiautomatic fire for the rifle. The fourth selector position is at 12 o'clock and controls the grenade launcher, allowing bullets and grenades to be fired using the same trigger. Because of this they both cannot be available at the same time.

There are two types of 20 mm grenade rounds for the K11; the K168 training round is for practice and has no explosives, while K167 explosive ammunition weighs 100 g (3.5 oz) and has an internal fuse with three selectable settings for point detonation, point detonation-delay, and airburst. The integrated weapon sight programs the airburst warheads after the laser rangefinder sights a target when the launcher is selected (the sight automatically provides aiming points for either bullets or grenades when their firing modes are selected). Point detonation explodes the shell on impact with a target and point detonation-delay lets the warhead penetrate a target before exploding; penetration ability is unknown.

The airburst setting detonates the grenade round in front of, over, or behind a target to hit troops in cover yielding an airburst effect capable of killing targets within a 6 m area and seriously wounding those within an 8 m area. Users enter a range at which the shell is to detonate into the sighting unit, which automatically calculates the time of flight and sets the chambered round's fuse to detonate when it reaches that point. If a round is not fired within two minutes of targeting information being programmed, it will disarm itself. If a grenade does not explode, a backup self-destruct safety mechanism automatically detonates it after being at rest two seconds after impact to leave no unexploded ordnance.

One of the problems with the previous American Objective Individual Combat Weapon, which influenced the combination rifle/airburst launcher concept, was that its 20 mm grenade rounds were not very lethal. The fragments were often too small and light to be effective, there was not enough explosive material to create a large kill radius, and many fragments were dispersed vertically and away from the target. This was one of the reasons the OICW effort was cancelled, and it is not known if these deficiencies were addressed with the K11's airburst grenades of the same size. However, Daewoo solved this problem by increasing the height of the grenade, and a recent report indicated that the 20mm airburst grenade has more lethal fragments than a 40 mm grenade. Furthermore, after the 2nd improvements, they developed a new technology which enabled the 20mm airburst grenade to explode in a single fixed direction to increase firepower, instead of exploding in all directions (which would reduce firepower).

The K11 is being upgraded to reduce the shock generated in firing the 5.56 mm rounds by as much as 40 percent, and similar technology is under review to decrease the shock of launching 20 mm shells. This will likely strengthen the ammunition power of the rifle make it easier to use, while also reducing the weight of the 6.1 kg (13 lb) weapon by 10 per cent.

== Users ==
- South Korea: Adopted by the Republic of Korea Armed Forces in 2010.
- United Arab Emirates

== See also ==
- XM29 OICW
- French Prototype PAPOP
- XM25 Individual Airburst Weapon System
- QTS-11
- Scicon IW
- Type 88 OICW
- M320
