= PAPOP =

Poly-Arme Polyprojectile
- PAPOP-1 (top) and 2 (bottom)
- Type: Bullpup assault rifle with Grenade launcher
- Place of origin: France

Service history
- In service: Prototype

Production history
- Designer: GIAT
- Designed: July 1995
- Manufacturer: GIAT
- Unit cost: 3000 Euros
- Produced: Cancelled
- Variants: PAPOP 1 PAPOP 2

Specifications
- Mass: 5.5 kg unloaded 7 kg with ammunition
- Length: 830 mm (33 in)
- Width: 120 mm (4.7 in)
- Height: 30 mm (1.2 in)
- Cartridge: 5.56×45mm NATO; 35mm grenade
- Cartridge weight: 12.31 g (190.0 gr); 200 g (3,100 gr)
- Caliber: 5.56 mm (0.219 in); 35 mm (1.4 in)
- Barrels: 2
- Action: Selective fire (rifle); Semi-automatic (grenade launcher)
- Muzzle velocity: 1,500 m/s (4,900 ft/s) (rifle); 1,650 m/s (5,400 ft/s) (grenade launcher)
- Effective firing range: 600 meters
- Feed system: 25-round detachable box magazine (both versions); 3-round tubular magazine (PAPOP 1 grenade launcher); 2-round tubular magazine (PAPOP 2 grenade launcher)
- Sights: Gun camera
- Filling: High-Explosive Fragmentation
- Filling weight: 43 g (1.5 oz)
- Detonation mechanism: Time fuze, Contact fuze

The PAPOP (PolyArme POlyProjectiles, "multi-projectile multi-weapon") was a French project to construct a computerized infantry weapon for the FÉLIN system, capable of hitting hidden or protected targets. It would have combined a 35 mm grenade launcher with a 5.56×45mm NATO assault rifle, both in a bullpup configuration, complete with targeting aids and an unorthodox sight.

== History ==
Development of the PAPOP began in July 1995. The project aimed to provide a replacement for the FAMAS then in service with the French Army by the year 2010. It was envisioned as a versatile weapon capable of engaging enemy infantry, even protected, with a range of up to 600 metres.

An industrial partnership was set up to answer the request, GIAT being the main contractor. The subsystems were designed by FN Herstal (for the assault rifle), Sfim ODS (targeting system), Euroimpact and Lacroix (grenades).

== Phase 1 ==
A first prototype was proposed with 3 grenades in an internal tubular magazine. The prototype was deemed too heavy (8 kg) and bulky to be acceptable, which led to the design of a second prototype.

== Phase 2 ==
The second prototype aimed at correcting the issues of the first one, reducing the weight to 6 kg and making the whole system more compact. A particular emphasis was put on usability in urban warfare.

The PAPOP-2 carries 25 5.56 mm cartridges and only two grenades, though a platoon-level configuration allows carrying 5 grenades, at the expense of the weight which then rises to 10 kg.

PAPOP 1

PAPOP 2. The silhouette of the first prototype is shown for comparison

== Systems ==
1. Assault rifle (5.56 mm); 2. Grenade launcher; 3. Orientable screen; 4. Camera; 5. Laser designator and telemeter; 6. Batteries and computer; 7. Weapon selector

=== Sub-calibre 5.56mm rifle ===
The rifle fires sub-calibre ammunition with a 5.56 NATO round, which has a muzzle velocity of 1600 metres per second, along with the capability of shooting up to range of 600m. The new ammunition offers an enhanced range, and increases the penetrability enough to defeat individual armour of the PASGT type even at great distance.

=== Grenade launcher ===
The second tube is a semi-automatic 35 mm grenade launcher with programmable airburst shells. A large selector switches from rifle to grenade.

Three grenades are carried in a tubular magazine. They can be programmed to explode near the target, with two selectable yields; pre-cut fragments can be projected either towards the front, the side or the rear of the projectile, depending on how the charge is activated, which are lethal in a 5-metre radius. The 35 mm calibre was selected as to offer capabilities to penetrate flak vests.

=== Electronic systems ===
A camera is fitted in the nose of the weapon, under the rifle muzzle. Batteries and the on-board computer are located in the stock. A rotating LCD screen on the top of the weapon displays information, allowing aiming the PAPOP from behind cover and around corners.

The targeting system includes night vision, a laser telemeter, and an IFF and a targeting computer which also programmes the grenades prior to launch.

The FÉLIN concept requires that data from the weapon could be shared with the other electronic component of the soldier, and transmitted across the battlefield to command posts or information centres. The PAPOP is thus a component of a larger integrated system, usable for reconnaissance or target designation.

== See also ==
- List of bullpup firearms
- List of assault rifles
