= Arash anti-materiel rifle =

Arash Anti-Materiel Rifle
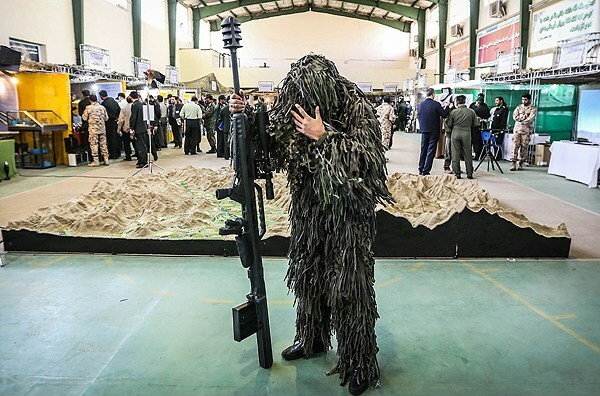
- Arash held by an IRGC soldier
- Type: Anti-materiel rifle
- Place of origin: Iran

Service history
- Used by: Iran and Hezbollah

Production history
- Designer: 2011
- Produced: 2013–present
- No. built: 1200

Specifications
- Mass: 20 kilograms (44 lb) with magazine
- Length: 180 centimetres (71 in)
- Cartridge: Probably 20×102mm, HEI
- Action: semi-automatic
- Muzzle velocity: 1050 m/s
- Maximum firing range: 3000 m
- Feed system: Box magazine
- Sights: Telescopic, BORS-like

Arash (Persian: آرش) is an Iranian 20mm semi-automatic anti-materiel sniper rifle. This weapon is used by Iran and Hezbollah, and is named for the mythical Arash the Archer.

== Features ==
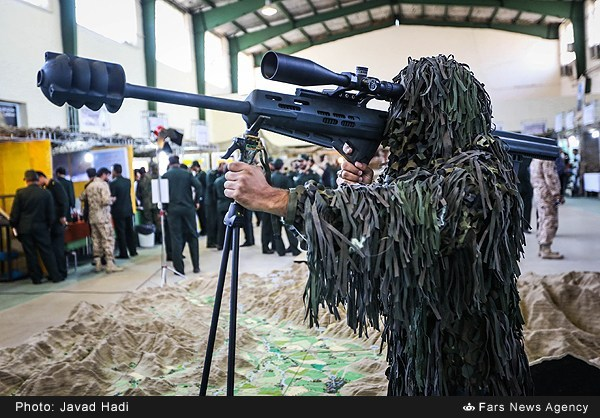
Arash anti-materiel rifle

The Arash sniper rifle is a semi-automatic weapon with rotating bolt and gas operated reloading. It has eight riflings straight back from left to right. It is 180 cm long and is equipped with an optical camera. It is typically used as a shoulder-fired weapon. The rifle masses between 18 and 20 kilograms, and fires 20 mm ammunition. It is fired in a standing position with a forward bipod and the gun resting over the user's shoulder, similar to an RPG. The stock is positioned midway along the length of the weapon with the pistol grip just forward of it. It is arranged in a bullpup configuration with the trigger assembly forward of the magazine, which is loaded behind the user's back, making reloading awkward. The recoil of firing a 20 mm round is mitigated by a huge cone-shaped quadruple baffle muzzle brake and the design of the gun which makes it pivot on the operator's shoulder. The scope appears to use a copy of the Barrett Optical Ranging System (BORS), which calculates atmospheric conditions to determine the rifle's optimal position to take an accurate shot. The position of the scope is relatively high, making it difficult to fire the rifle in the prone position, so the Iranians operate it using two-man motorcycle teams to perform "shoot and scoot" tactics. The Arash can be used to target hostile helicopters at a range of approximately 2,000 meters, and has the ability to be used against ground and armored targets as well as enemy trenches.

== Users ==
- Iran
- Hezbollah
- Liwa Assad Allah al-Ghalib fi al-Iraq wa al-Sham

== See also ==
- M82A2 – (United States) (Shouldered 12.7mm bullpup meant to use against helicopters)
- Anzio 20mm rifle – (United States)
- Baher 23mm – (Iran)
- Denel NTW-20 – (South Africa)
- RT-20 (rifle) – (Croatia)
- Vidhwansak – (India)
- List of anti-aircraft weapons
- Anti-aircraft warfare
