= XM312 =

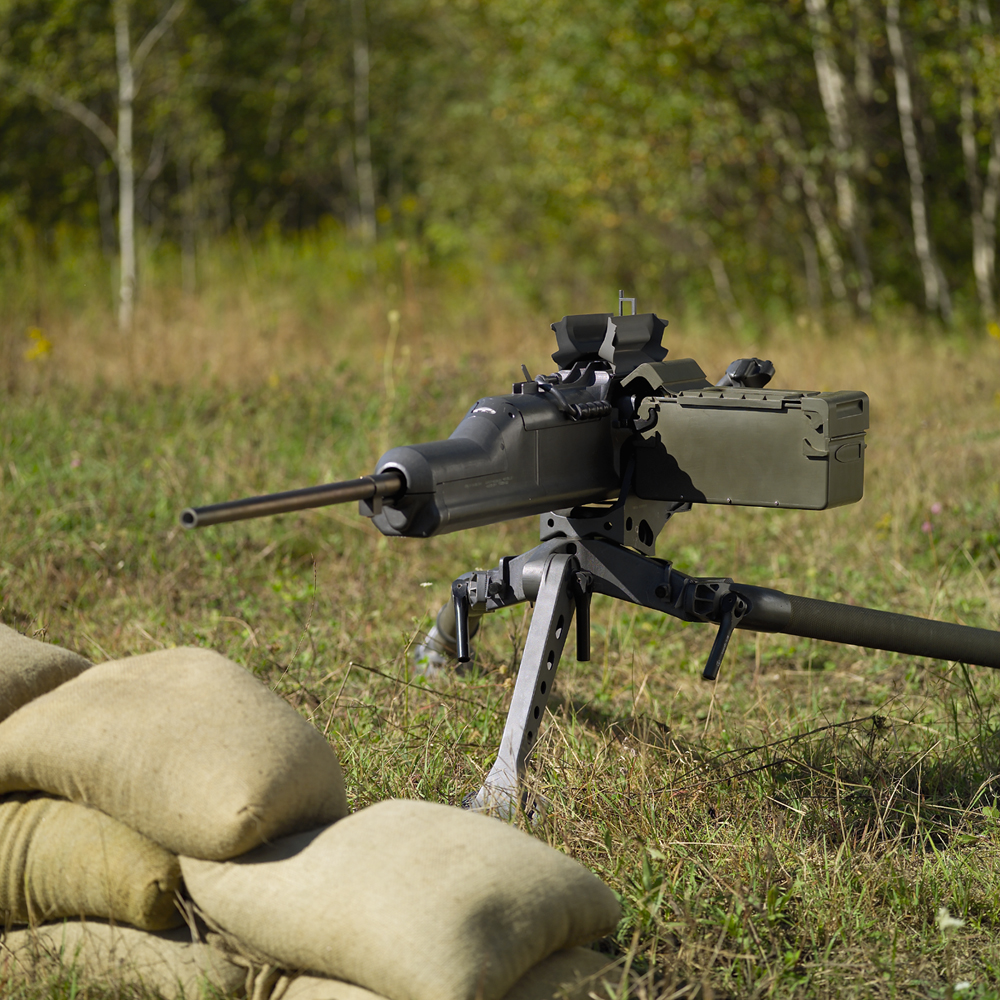
- A XM312 with its ground mount system
- Type: Heavy machine gun
- Place of origin: United States

Production history
- Designer: General Dynamics/Joint Services Small Arms Program
- Designed: 1990
- Manufacturer: General Dynamics
- Produced: 2004
- Variants: XM307

Specifications
- Mass: 16 kg (35.27 lb) (gun only); 24 kg (52.91 lb) (mount system); 40 kg (88.18 lb) (whole system)
- Length: 61.42 in (1,560 mm)
- Barrel length: 36 in (914 mm)
- Width: 9.84 in (250 mm)
- Height: 7 in (180 mm), 18 in (460 mm) adjustable tripod
- Crew: 2
- Cartridge: .50 BMG
- Caliber: 0.50 in (12.7 mm)
- Action: "Recoil-reducing action" (modified rotating bolt)
- Rate of fire: 260 rpm
- Maximum firing range: lethal and suppressive to 2,000 meters
- Feed system: Belt-fed
- Sights: Open, optics may be mounted.

The XM312 was a heavy machine gun derived from the XM307 25 mm autocannon and chambered for the .50 BMG cartridge. It was designed in response to the Objective Crew Served Weapon project by the U.S. military for a replacement for the aging M2 Browning heavy machine gun, and as a complement to the heavier XM307 Advanced Crew Served Weapon grenade launcher.

It was capable of being converted quickly into an XM307 with a small number of parts and a few minutes of work at the unit level (and vice versa from the XM307).

The Fiscal Year 2008 Appropriations bill awarded $10 million to General Dynamics for the XM307 and XM312.

In May 2008 the U.S. Army had awarded General Dynamics Armament and Technical Products (GDATP) a $9 million contract to develop a lightweight .50-caliber machine gun called the XM806 to supplement the Browning M2. The XM806 was canceled in 2012. The Army instead continued buying new M2s and Mk 19s to replenish the current guns that are wearing out.

== Specifications ==
- Weight:
  - Weight: 35 lb (16 kg) (weapon only).
  - Weight: 53 lb (24 kg) (ground mount system).
  - Weight: 88 lb (40 kg) (whole system).
- Dimensions: 9.9W × 7.2H × 61.5L max. inches (251 mm × 183 mm × 1562 mm) (52.5L, 1334 mm) charged).
- Portability: Man portable or vehicle mountable.
- Stability: Up to 18 inch (460 mm) tripod height.
- Operation: Currently a hybrid gas & recoil operating group. Gas powers the bolt mechanism while recoil drives the barrel/barrel extension and the feed system. Design changes are underway to totally eliminate the gas system to provide increased reliability and reduced complexity.
- Environmental: Operationally insensitive to conditions.
- Reliability: 6,000 MRBF (threshold) / 10,000 MRBF (objective).
- Rate of fire:
  - 260 rounds per minute (4.3 Hz)(cyclic).
  - 40 rounds per minute (0.7 Hz) (sustained, without barrel change). In burst of five to seven rounds, the same as the M2HB.
- Dispersion: Less than 1.1 milliradian, one sigma radius.
- Range: Lethal and suppressive out to 2,000 meters.
- Ammunition: .50 BMG M33 ball, M8, M20 & Mk211 API, M903 SLAP.
- Recoil: 300 foot-pounds (407 J)
- Feed system: Weapon-mountable ammunition can or feed from any can using bellmouth attachment. M9 rear stripping link—common with current M2 ammunition. Left hand feed, right hand eject of cases and links.

== Program status ==
- September 2005: The XM312 is test fired by troops from the 1st Infantry Division at the Grafenwöhr Training Area in Germany.
