= OSW =

OSW may refer to:

- Centre for Eastern Studies, a Polish think tank
- FAL OSW, a variant of the FN FAL folding-stock paratrooper rifle
- Objective Sniper Weapon, the original name of the Barrett XM109
- Official Scrabble Words, a Scrabble lexicon
- Open Spatial Workshop, a group of three Australian artists, winner of the 2005 Melbourne Prize for Urban Sculpture
- Office of the Secretary of War
