= Barrett XM109 =

Barrett XM109 AMPR
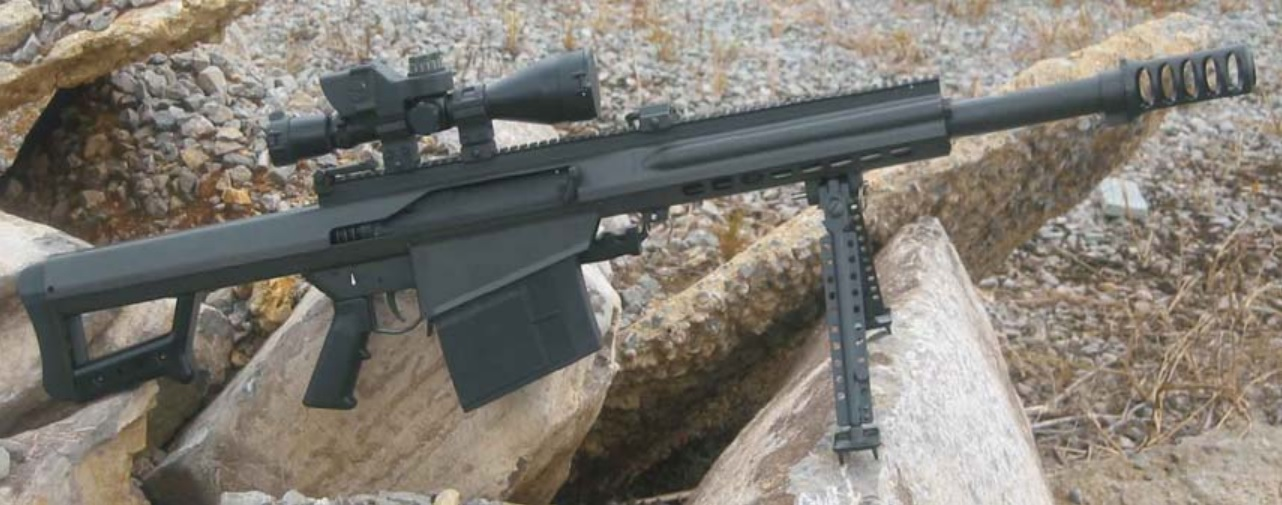
- Type: Direct-fire grenade launcher
- Place of origin: United States

Production history
- Designer: Ronnie Barrett
- Manufacturer: Barrett Firearms Manufacturing

Specifications
- Mass: 33.2 lb (15.1 kg)
- Length: 46 in (120 cm)
- Barrel length: 17.6 in (45 cm)
- Cartridge: 25 × 59 mm
- Caliber: 25mm
- Action: Semi-automatic, short recoil
- Effective firing range: 2,000 metres (2,200 yd)
- Maximum firing range: 3,600 metres (3,900 yd)
- Feed system: 5-round detachable box magazine

The Barrett XM109, originally known as the Objective Sniper Weapon (OSW) and now called the Anti-Materiel Payload Rifle (AMPR), is a prototype semi-automatic grenade launcher. It is chambered for 25 × 59 mm grenade rounds and was developed by Barrett Firearms Manufacturing. It was designed in accordance with a requirement set out in 1994, and is capable of defeating light armor and equipment out to 2 km (1.2 miles).

== History ==
Prototypes of the XM109 have existed since the late 1990s and studies of the weapon's effectiveness were released in 2002; 10 prototypes were known to exist in 2004, and the XM109 and Barrett XM500 were folded into a broader Anti-Material Rifle Congressional Program in 2006. As of April 2026, status of the XM109 is not clear, with no news of either cancellation or potential adoption.

== Overview ==
The XM109, originally known as the Objective Sniper Weapon (OSW) and now called the Anti-Materiel Payload Rifle (AMPR), is a semi-automatic grenade launcher, designed primarily for engagement of light armored vehicles and similar targets. The design uses the lower receiver from an M82/M107, but with a new upper receiver chambered in 25mm. The upper receiver of the M82 rifles can be replaced with an XM109 upper receiver to form a fully functional XM109 rifle.

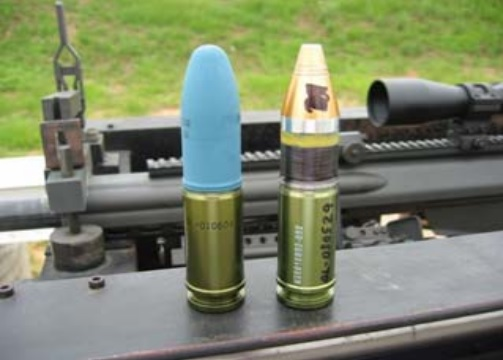
25 mm rounds for the XM109: XM1050 TP and XM1049 HEDP

The 25 × 59 mm round that is used in the XM109 is the same one originally developed for the cancelled XM307, product of the Objective (later Advanced) Crew Served Weapon program (OCSW / ACSW). As with the XM307, the XM109 can be reconfigured back to .50 BMG, in the XM109's case this is done by swapping the 25mm upper receiver for a standard M82 / M107 upper.

The XM109 offers greater range and a shorter overall length than the previous M82/M107 systems, as well as potentially greater power in the 25 × 59 mm cartridge over even the Mk 211 .50 BMG cartridge (AKA "Raufoss round"). However, the small amount of propellant and heavy projectile resulted in unacceptably high recoil due to limiting the effects of the weapon's muzzle brake, with a recoil force of over 60 foot-pounds compared to 36 for the M107. As of 2004, one of the project goals was to reduce the weapon's recoil.

== Features ==
- Picatinny rail
- BORS ballistic computer
- Monopod socket
- Dual-chamber detachable muzzle brake or suppressor system
- Detachable bipod and carry handle

== In popular culture ==
- Mentioned in Person of Interest S4E6 as a "State-of-the-art next-generation weapon" that uses "high explosive" rounds that could "wreak havoc on the city [of New York]".

== See also ==
- Barrett M82
- Barrett XM500
- List of anti-materiel rifles
- List of firearms
- List of individual weapons of the U.S. Armed Forces
- Neopup PAW-20
- Norinco LG5 / QLU-11
- XM25 CDTE
- Raufoss Mk 211
