= 25 mm =

25 mm may refer to:

- 25 mm caliber, a large caliber round, used by cannon and autocannon
- 25 mm grenade, an explosive round used by some grenade launchers
- 1 inch
