= XM806 =

Type of heavy machine gun

XM806 Lightweight .50 Caliber Machine Gun
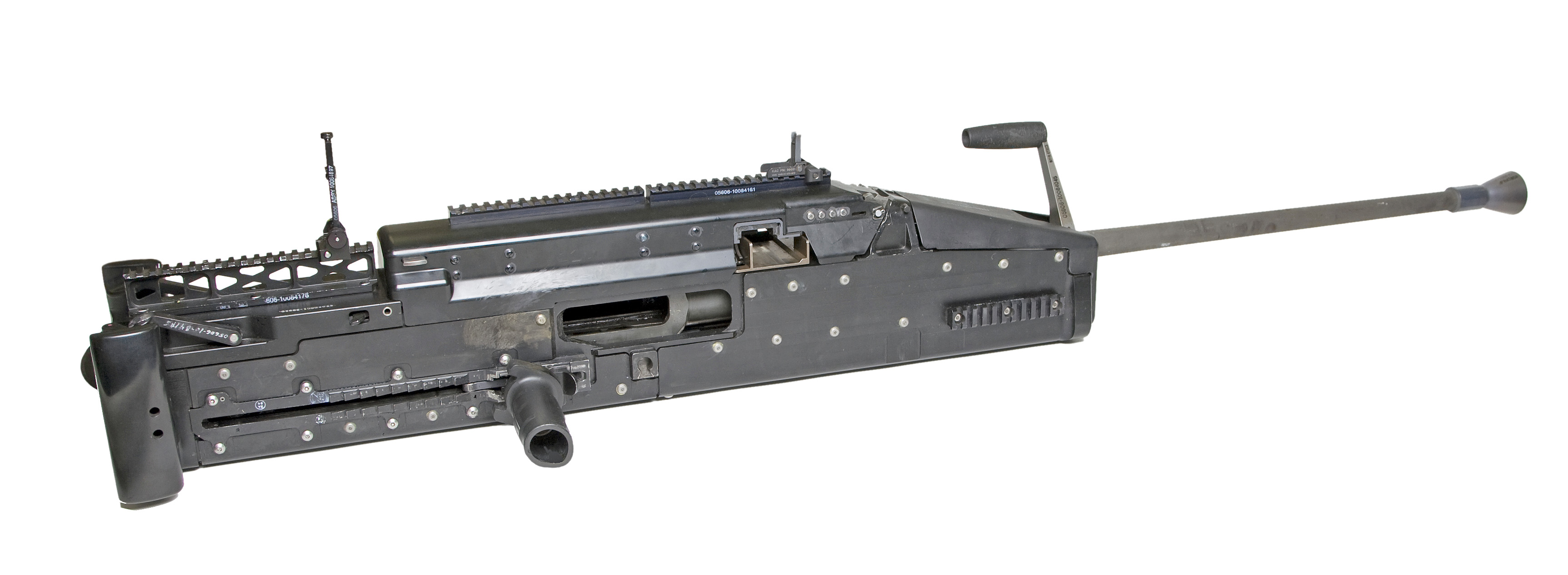
- Type: Heavy machine gun
- Place of origin: United States

Production history
- Designer: General Dynamics
- Manufacturer: General Dynamics

Specifications
- Mass: 40 lb (18 kg) (without XM205 tripod)
- Length: 1562 mm
- Cartridge: .50 BMG
- Action: Recoil operation
- Rate of fire: 265 rounds per minute or 40 rounds per minute sustained
- Feed system: M9 belt
- Sights: Modified M145 Machine Gun Optic, BUIS

The XM806 Lightweight .50 Caliber Machine Gun (LW50MG) was a developmental .50 caliber belt-fed heavy machine gun. Development began in 2009 and was cancelled in 2012.

== Design ==
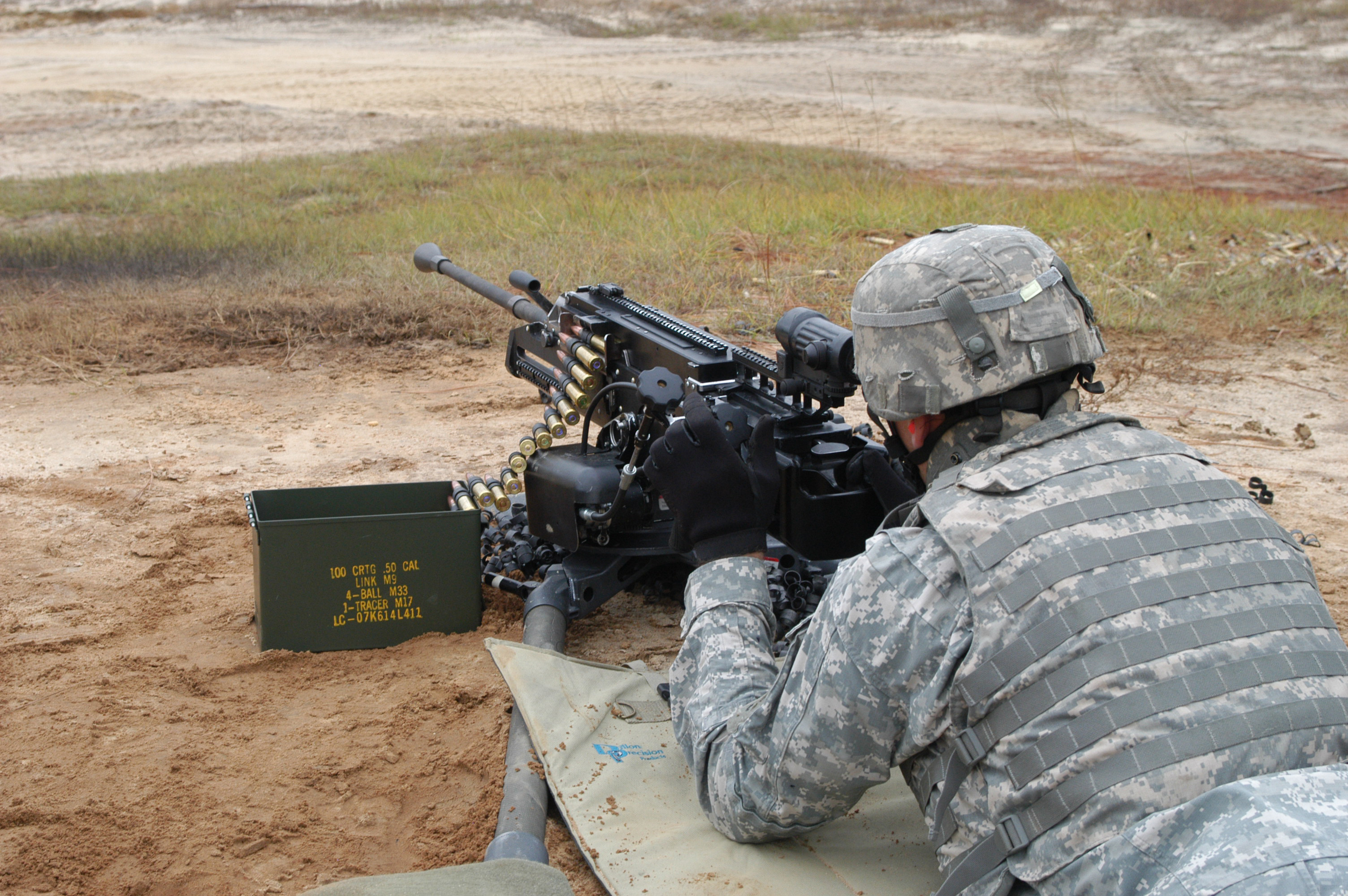
XM806, 2010

The XM806 weighed about 63 pounds (29 kg) less (49% lighter), had 60% less recoil than the M2, and had a greater rate of fire than the failed previous attempt to replace the M2, the XM312. The XM806 did however have a considerably slower rate of fire than the M2. The XM806 also had improvements to user safety and was easier to disassemble.

The XM806 was spun out from the cancelled XM307 and was developed by General Dynamics to augment the M2. General Dynamics received a $9 million contract for the weapon in May 2008. It was expected to be deployed starting at the end of fiscal year 2012. Delays caused its planned deployment to be pushed to 2013 or 2014. The XM806 was cancelled in July 2012, with the Army using the money allocated to upgrade their M2 machine guns to the M2A1 version.
