= OCSW =

1980s United States military arms program

The OCSW (Objective Crew Served Weapon) was a U.S. Military arms program started in the 1980s that led to a hybrid smaller prototype automatic autocannon developed by General Dynamics Armament Systems. It led to the XM312 and XM307 designs.

As a part of the SAMP (Small Arms Master Plan) program, it had the same laser targeting system as the XM29 OICW, but was intended to supplement the 40 mm Mk 19 grenade launcher and the .50 M2 Browning machine gun. It could fire armor-piercing or explosive 25 mm grenades at a cyclic rate of 260 rounds per minute, and had an effective range up to 2 kilometres. It underwent combat trials before being cancelled.

== See also ==
- Objective Individual Combat Weapon A related project.
- Autocannon
- Mk 47 a 40 mm grenade launcher, also replacing the Mk 19 in some roles.
- XM25 CDTE a 25 mm low velocity smart cannon/grenade launcher for an individual soldier.
- XM8 a 5.56 mm weapon system
- Barrett XM109 a rifle designed to fire the same 25 mm grenades
