= QLU-11 =

QLU-11 Type 11 Grenade Launching Sniper
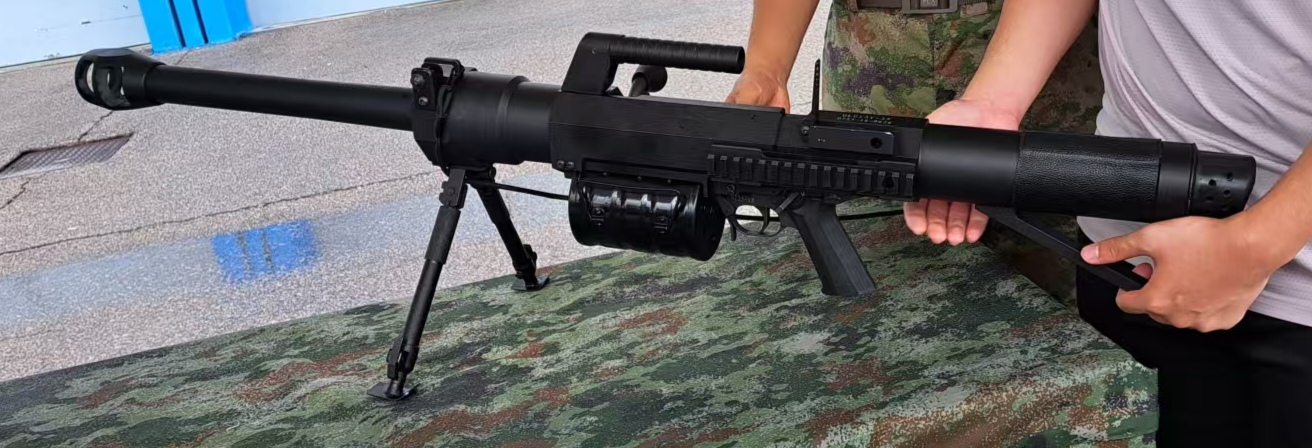
- QLU-11 without its fire control system
- Type: Direct-fire grenade launcher
- Place of origin: People's Republic of China

Service history
- In service: 2011–present

Production history
- Manufacturer: Norinco
- Variants: Norinco LG5

Specifications
- Mass: 12.9 kg (28 lb) on bipod 23 kg (51 lb) on tripod
- Length: 1,225 mm (48.2 in)
- Cartridge: 40×53mm HV; 35x32mm SR
- Action: hybrid short-recoil and advanced primer ignition (API) blowback
- Rate of fire: Semi-automatic
- Muzzle velocity: 320 m/s (1,000 ft/s)
- Effective firing range: 1,000 m (1,100 yd) (point target); 2,200 m (2,400 yd) (area target)
- Feed system: Drum magazine 4 or 15 rounds (40mm HV); 3, 5, or 7 rounds (35mm SR)
- Sights: Y/MJL11-005 fire control sight system QMD-131 electro-optical daylight scope QMV-131 electro-optical night vision scope

The LG5 (PLAGF military designation: QLU-11 or QLU-131) is a semi-automatic grenade launcher developed by Norinco and introduced in 2011. The launcher's designation "QLU" stands for "light weapon (Qīng Wŭqì) - grenade (Liúdàn) - sniper (Jūjī)" in Chinese military coding standard.

== Description ==
The LG5/QLU-11 can be equipped with free-floating barrel, a fire-control system with a laser rangefinder, thermal imaging capability, and a ballistic computer that gives it air burst capability. The muzzle brake is fitted with a fuse programmer for specialized air burst munitions. The QLU-11 was tested in combat against Somali pirates in the Gulf of Aden by Chinese marines. The LG5/QLU-11 is designed for long-range use and so has been described as a "sniper" grenade launcher.

Befitting that designation, it is said to have a very high accuracy of 3-round R100 accuracy of 1 m (3.3 ft) at 600 m (2,000 ft) range using the BGJ5 ammunition, meaning that with proper aiming the weapon can put three successive high-explosive rounds into a typical window or door. Its development was inspired by the American Barrett XM109 anti-materiel rifle, which fires 25 × 59 mm grenades, and its design is based on the Chinese HSARI LR2 12.7 × 108 mm anti-materiel rifle.

QLU-11 utilizes a new Type 11 precision cartridge that is derived from the DFJ-87 armor-piercing grenade. The lighter casing reduces the ammunition weight from 217 g (0.478 lb) to 200 g (0.44 lb). Propellant takes a larger percentage of the cartridge space, thus improving the velocity to 320 m/s (1,000 ft/s) (from 195 m/s (640 ft/s); a specialized high velocity round reportedly has around 400–413 m/s (1,310–1,350 ft/s)). This modification greatly increases the recoil, which QLU-11 features a recoiling free-floating barrel with advanced primer ignition (API) blowback action, a large muzzle brake, floating receiver, and two sets of buffer mechanism inside the stock and optics rail mounts to mitigate.

To ensure the long-range accuracy, the electro-optical sight system with built-in fire control system is standard issue for the QLU-11. The daylight scope is designated QMD-131, while the night vision version is designated QMV-131. Both scopes feature in-scope HUD, a laser rangefinder, temperature sensor, ammo selection, ballistic calculated reticle, elevation angle sensor, inclination angle sensor, drift correction sensor, self-diagnosis software. The effective range is 1,000 m (3,300 ft) for daylight scope and 800 m (2,600 ft) for night vision scope.

== Variants ==
There are two variants of the weapon, an export version and a domestic version:

- LG5: Export version. Fires 40×53mm HV NATO grenades, which are also exported by China
- QLU-11: Domestic version. Fires 35×32mm SR grenades

== Ammunition ==
=== LG5 ===
- BGJ5 high-explosive, dual-purpose (HEDP) sniper grenade, 40×53mm
- BGL3 high-explosive precision grenade, 40×53mm
- BGL3A programmable airburst grenade, 40×53mm
- BGH1 high-explosive incendiary grenade, 40×53mm
- BGR1 incendiary grenade, 40×53mm
- BGS1 training grenade, 40×53mm

=== QLU-11 ===
- Type 11 high speed precision cartridge, 35×32mm SR
- Type 11 programmable airburst cartridge, 35×32mm SR

== Users ==
- Cambodia
- China
- Saudi Arabia

== See also ==
- List of API blowback firearms
- List of grenade launchers
- QBU-10
- QTS-11
- XM25 CDTE
- Barrett XM109
- Neopup PAW-20
