= Anzio 20mm rifle =

Anzio 20mm Anti-Materiel Rifle
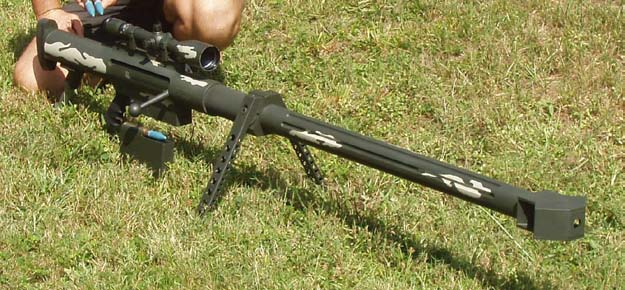
- Anzio 20mm
- Type: Anti-materiel rifle
- Place of origin: United States

Service history
- Used by: United States of America

Production history
- Manufacturer: Anzio Iron Works
- Produced: 2006–present

Specifications
- Mass: 59 to 130 pounds (27 to 59 kg)
- Length: 80 inches (2.0 m) w/ brake 96.5 inches (2.45 m) w/ suppressor
- Barrel length: 49 inches (1.2 m)
- Cartridge: 20×102mm 14.5×114mm Anzio 20-50
- Action: Bolt action
- Muzzle velocity: 1,006 meters per second (3,300 ft/s) (20mm vulcan)
- Maximum firing range: 4,572 meters (15,000 ft; 2.841 mi)
- Feed system: 3-round detachable box magazine

The Anzio 20mm rifle is an American anti-materiel rifle designed and marketed by Anzio Iron Works. It is the first American anti-materiel rifle designed and mass-produced for public sale with a bore diameter in excess of .50 caliber in over 80 years. The rifles are available in three calibers, with the rifle's predominant chambering being the 20mm Vulcan caliber.

== Features ==
Other notable features include an optional three-round detachable box magazine, a 49-inch (1.2 m) barrel, and threaded muzzle to accept either a muzzle brake or suppressor. The total length of the rifle is 2.5 meters (8' 2.4").

== Performance ==
At approximately 48,000 ft⋅lbf (65,000 J) of kinetic energy, the 20mm round, as fired out of the Anzio rifle, has nearly four times the energy of the .50 BMG cartridge fired out of a comparable rifle, which is around 12,200 ft⋅lbf (16,500 J) of kinetic energy. The .600 Nitro Express, the second most powerful African big-game rifle cartridge, has around 8,200 ft⋅lbf (11,100 J) of kinetic energy. This makes a 20mm Anzio rifle 5.85 times as powerful as a rifle chambered in .600 Nitro Express.

The Anzio 20/50 has approximately 22,000 ft⋅lbf (30,000 J) of kinetic energy with an 800-grain (52 g) bullet. It does this by taking the .50 BMG projectile, which already is relatively large and travels extremely fast, and increases the already supersonic bullet to over 1.3 times its normal flight velocity, creating more kinetic energy without the need for a larger and heavier projectile. Though its kinetic energy is significantly lower than the 20mm round, it is almost as effective due to its smaller surface area, meaning that it has less material to punch through, making it easier to penetrate, but the lighter bullet makes transferring energy over longer distances and into targets less efficient.

== Operator ==
- United States: The Federal Bureau of Investigation purchased two 20mm rifles from Anzio in 2009.

== See also ==
=== Before 1945 ===
- Lahti L-39 – (Finland)
- Solothurn S-18/1000 – (Switzerland)

=== After 1945 ===
- Arash anti-materiel rifle – (Iran)
- Baher 23mm – (Iran)
- Denel NTW-20 – (South Africa)
- Istiglal AMR – (Azerbaijan)
- Metallic RT-20 – (Croatia)
