= Neopup PAW-20 =

PAW-20 "Neopup"
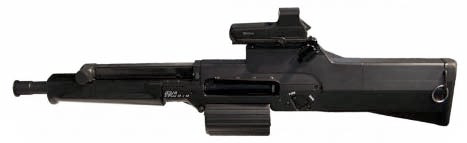
- Type: Direct-fire grenade launcher
- Place of origin: South Africa

Service history
- In service: 2015–present

Production history
- Designer: Tony Neophytou
- Designed: 1999
- Manufacturer: Gemaco Elbree PTY LTD (former), Denel PMP (current)
- Produced: in limited production by Denel PMP as of late 2015, under the name Inkunzi

Specifications
- Mass: 5.9 kg (12.9 lb), empty
- Length: 845 mm (33.3 in) (deployed), 770 mm (30.3 in) (stowed)
- Barrel length: 355 mm (14.0 in)
- Width: 115 mm (4.5 in)
- Height: 185 mm (7.3 in)
- Cartridge: 20×42mm point-detonating rounds developed by PMP Denel
- Action: Inertial operation with a rotating bolt
- Muzzle velocity: 310 m/s (1000 ft/s)
- Effective firing range: 600 m for point targets. 800 m for suppressive fire (soldiers in a group.) 1000 m for area targets.
- Feed system: 7-round box magazine (discontinued for feeding issue) or 6-round rotary magazine
- Sights: Holographic sight (but others available)

The Neopup PAW-20 (Personal Assault Weapon, 20 mm) is a 20 by 42 millimetres (0.79 in × 1.65 in) semi-automatic grenade launcher designed by Tony Neophytou and as of 2015, is produced and marketed by Denel.

== Overview ==
The PAW-20 is a hand-held, semi-automatic direct fire grenade launcher that fires a 20×42mm point-detonating round. It holds six rounds in a detachable rotary magazine, with an effective range of 300–400 metres (980–1,310 ft). It was designed mainly as an anti-personnel grenade launcher for use against opposition closely grouped together or behind light cover. However, it is also compatible with less-than-lethal ammunition. The PAW-20 is in direct competition with the more complicated and expensive joint German-U.S. XM25 CDTE and Korean S&T Daewoo K11.

The PAW-20 has attracted some criticism due to the location of the ejection port. On slow motion footage it can be seen that ejection happens after the hydraulic buffer is fully contracted, which brings the ejection port right to shooters face.

Due to the unique location of the pistol grip on the side of the weapon, it can be fired from the left shoulder for a right-handed operator by simply placing the butt on the left shoulder, with no hand swapping necessary. This allows the user the advantage of being able to fire from around or under cover, with little time required to change the grip on the weapon. The right-handed location of the pistol grip also allows the weapon to recoil unimpeded into the shoulder of the operator, allowing for a much more manageable recoil than most weapons of this class. Moreover, the weapon uses the recoil to operate, instead of more traditional gas operated systems and is an interesting example of an inertial operated weapon.

== 20×42 mm cartridge ==
Developed from the 20×82mm (MG 151/20 cartridge), the 20×42 mm cartridge was specifically developed for the PAW-20 by Denel PMP, decreasing the overall weight and size of the weapon, and enabling it to hold more rounds in the magazine, compared to weapons of similar purpose and design, such as the XM25 CDTE, which typically fire 25 millimetres (0.98 in) or larger grenades. It has a muzzle velocity of 310 metres per second (1,000 ft/s), and a much flatter trajectory than the more common 40 millimetres (1.6 in) grenade launcher round. A number of less-than-lethal rounds are also available for the PAW-20.

== Users ==
- Iraq
  - Kurdistan – Peshmerga

== See also ==
- RGSh-30 – (Ukraine)
- Norinco LG5 / QLU-11 – (China)
- OICW – (United States)
- Milkor MGL – (South Africa)
- Barrett XM109 – (United States)
- XM25 CDTE – (Germany, United States)
- Barrett M82A1A – (United States)
- Raufoss Mk 211
