= STK SSW (firearm) =

Semi-automatic squad support weapon

The STK SSW is an experimental semi-automatic squad support weapon being manufactured by STK in Singapore. It is capable of firing 5.7mm rounds and four different caliber airbursting 40mm grenades. Within one of the bullets, there is a pocket full of 400 tungsten balls. When impacting on target, the pocket will burst resulting in a conical shape of damage similar to those of a shotgun. The platform consists of a fire-control system mounted on top. This is the master interface of the weapons firing systems, aiming, and more.

The SSW was planned as part of the Future Light Support Weapon program made by Sweden, its goal to replace the Mk19 and M203 grenade launchers at squad and platoon levels. Prototypes of the weapon have been made for display and testing, but as of 2017 it has not been put into service or made into a full-scale production project.
