= High-explosive incendiary =

Type of ammunition

In warfare, high-explosive incendiary (HEI) is a type of ammunition specially designed to impart energy and therefore damage to its target in one or both of two ways: via a high-explosive charge and/or via its incendiary (fire-causing) effects. Each round—by definition—has both capabilities. They are a specialized kind of High Explosive Shell.

HEI ammunition is fused either mechanically or chemically. The armor-piercing ability can vary widely, allowing for more focused fragmentation or larger scatter.

== History ==
HEI ammunition was originally developed for use in large-caliber cannon, howitzer and naval artillery. Currently, HEI rounds are most commonly made in medium-caliber sizes of 20, 25, 30, and 35 mm. They are fired from various platforms, including aircraft, anti-aircraft cannons, and anti-missile systems.

HEI ammunition has also been used on the battlefield against tanks and other armored vehicles, but mostly in a last ditch attempt to disable external components.

== Uses ==
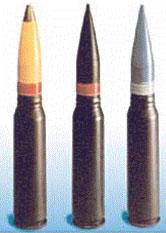
The shell on the left is a 30 mm HEI

HEI rounds are mainly used in incendiary rounds against softer targets such as aircraft, infantry, and unarmored vehicles.

== See also ==
- High explosive incendiary/armor piercing ammunition (HEIAP)
- Mine shell
- Raufoss Mk 211
