= Autocannon =

Rapid-fire projectile weapon that fires armour-piercing or explosive shells

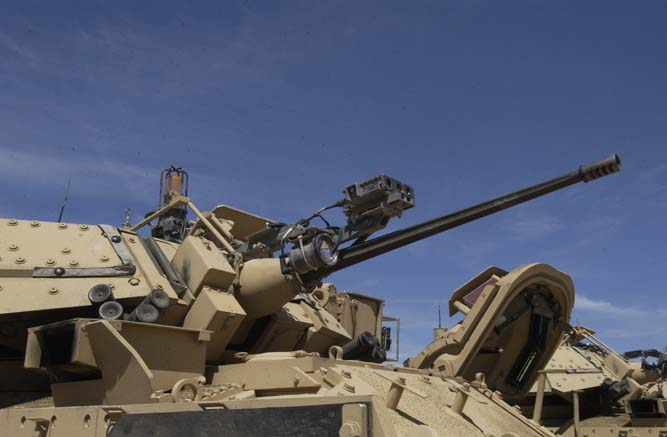
US M242 Bushmaster 25 mm autocannon mounted on an M2 Bradley armoured fighting vehicle

An autocannon, automatic cannon, machine cannon or anti-tank machine gun, is a fully automatic gun that is capable of rapid-firing large-calibre (20 mm/0.79 in or more) armour-piercing, explosive or incendiary shells, as opposed to the smaller-caliber kinetic projectiles (bullets) fired by a machine gun. Autocannons have a longer effective range and greater terminal performance than machine guns, due to the use of larger/heavier munitions (most often in the range of 20–60 mm (0.79–2.36 in), but bigger calibers also exist), but are usually smaller than tank guns, howitzers, field guns, or other artillery. When used on its own, the word "autocannon" typically indicates a non-rotary weapon with a single barrel. When multiple rotating barrels are involved, such a weapon is referred to as a "rotary autocannon" or "rotary cannon". If it uses a single barrel with a rotating cylinder with multiple chambers, it is known as a "revolver autocannon" or "revolver cannon"; both of these systems are commonly used as aircraft guns and anti-aircraft guns.

Autocannons are heavy weapons that are unsuitable for use by infantry. Due to the heavy weight and recoil, they are typically installed on fixed mounts, wheeled carriages, ground combat vehicles, aircraft, or watercraft, and are almost always crew-served, or even remote-operated with automatic target recognition/acquisition (e.g. sentry guns and naval CIWS). As such, ammunition is typically fed from a belt system to reduce reloading pauses or for a faster rate of fire, but magazines remain an option. Common types of ammunition, among a wide variety, include HEIAP, HEDP and more specialised armour-piercing (AP) munitions, mainly composite rigid (APCR) and discarding sabot (APDS) rounds.

Capable of generating extremely rapid firepower, autocannons overheat quickly if used for sustained fire, and are limited by the amount of ammunition that can be carried by the weapons systems mounting them. Both the US 25 mm M242 Bushmaster and the British 30 mm RARDEN have relatively slow rates of fire so as not to deplete ammunition too quickly. The Oerlikon KBA 25 mm has a relatively mid-high rate of fire 650 rounds per minute but can be electronically programmed to 175–200 rounds per minute. The rate of fire of a modern autocannon ranges from 90 rounds per minute, in the case of the British RARDEN, to 2,500 rounds per minute with the GIAT 30. Rotary systems with multiple barrels can achieve over 10,000 rounds per minute (the Russian GSh-6-23, for example). Such extremely high rates of fire are effectively employed by aircraft in aerial dogfights and close air support on ground targets via strafing attacks, where the target dwell time is short and weapons are typically operated in brief bursts.

== History ==
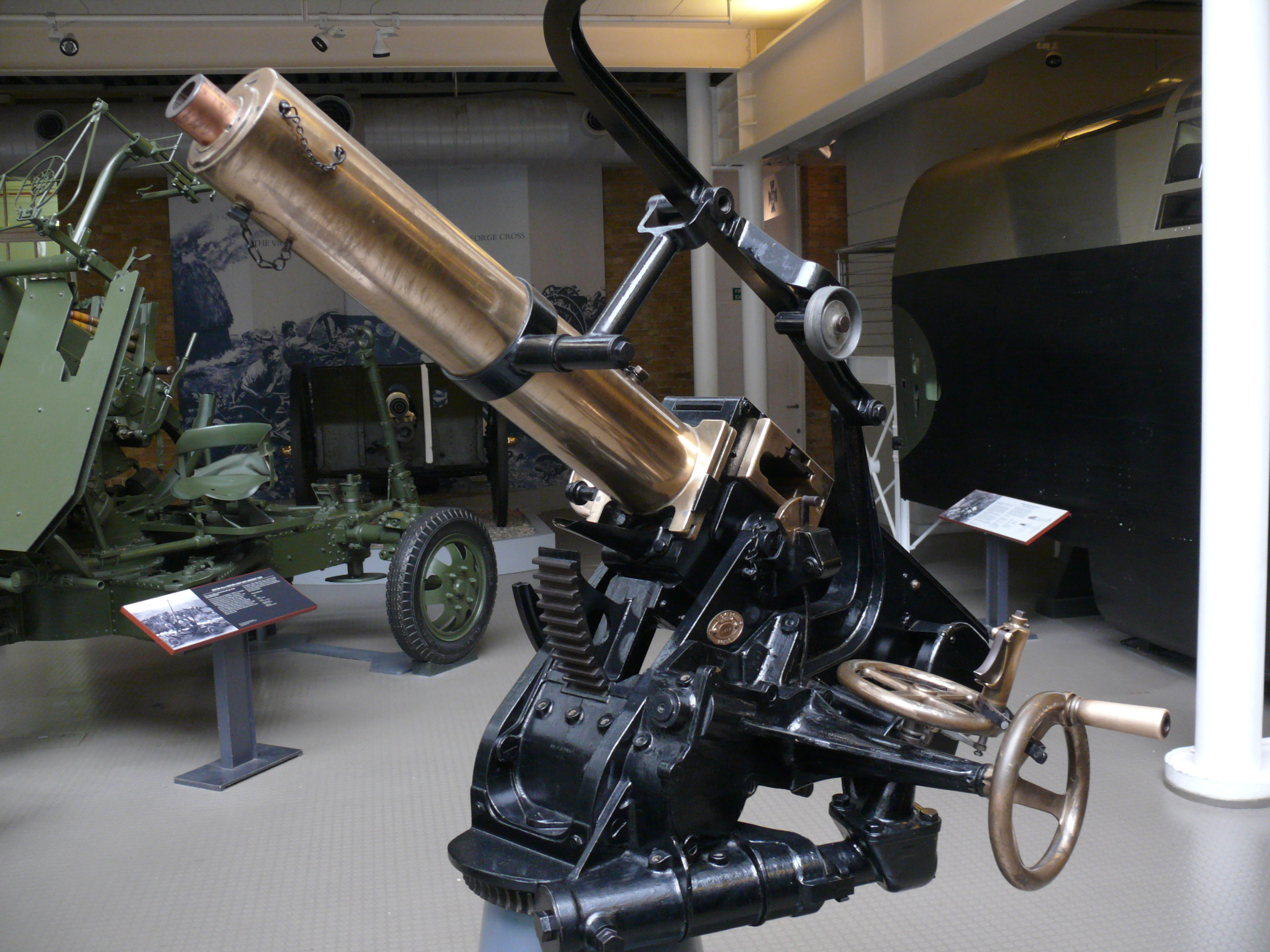
QF 1-pounder Mk II "pom-pom" of 1903

=== Early developments ===
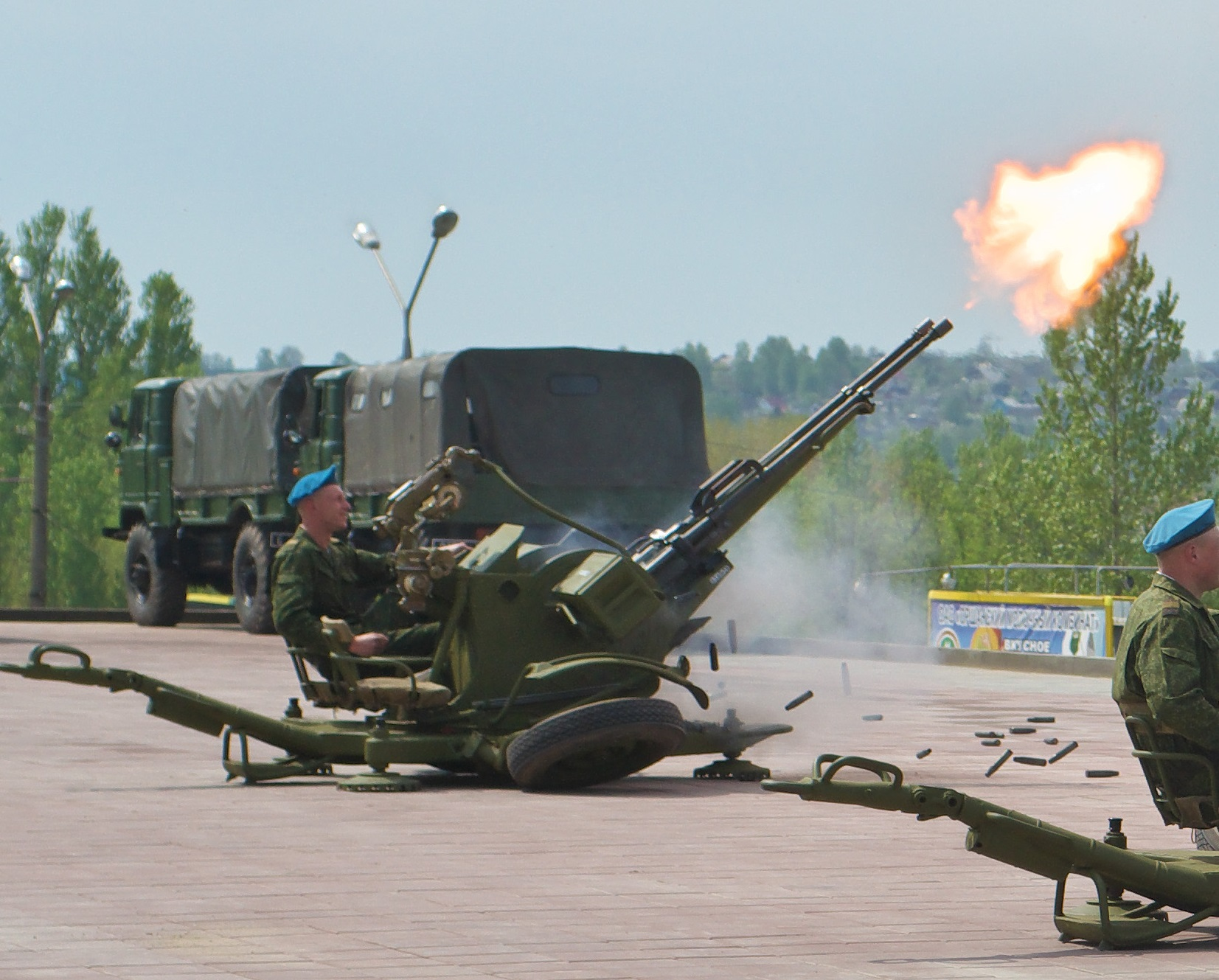
ZU-23-2, a twin barrel 23×152 mm anti-aircraft autocannon from the 1960s still in service with some former members of the Warsaw Pact

The first modern autocannon was the British QF 1-pounder, also known as the "pom-pom". This was essentially an enlarged version of the Maxim gun, which was the first successful fully automatic machine gun, requiring no outside stimulus in its firing cycle other than holding the trigger. The pom-pom fired 1 pound (0.45 kg) gunpowder-filled explosive shells at a rate of over 200 rounds a minute: much faster than conventional artillery while possessing a much longer range and more firepower than the infantry rifle.

In 1913, Reinhold Becker and his Stahlwerke Becker firm designed the 20mm Becker cannon, addressing the German Empire's perceived need for heavy-calibre aircraft armament. The Imperial Government's Spandau Arsenal assisted them in perfecting the ordnance. Although only about 500+ examples of the original Becker design were made during World War I, the design's patent was acquired by the Swiss Oerlikon Contraves firm in 1924, with the Third Reich's Ikaria-Werke firm of Berlin using Oerlikon design patents in creating the MG FF wingmount cannon ordnance. The Imperial Japanese Navy's Type 99 cannon, adopted and produced in 1939, was also based on the Becker/Oerlikon design's principles.

During the First World War, autocannons were mostly used in the trenches as anti-aircraft guns. The British used pom-pom guns as part of their air defences to counter the German Zeppelin airships that made regular bombing raids on London. However, they were of little value, as their shells neither ignited the hydrogen of the Zeppelins nor caused sufficient loss of gas (and hence lift) to bring them down. Attempts to use the guns in aircraft failed, as the weight severely limited both speed and altitude, thus making successful interception impossible. The more effective QF 2 pounder naval gun would be developed during the war to serve as an anti-aircraft and close range defensive weapon for naval vessels.

=== Second World War ===
Autocannons would serve to a much greater extent and effect during the Second World War. The German Panzer II light tank, which was one of the most numerous in German service during the invasion of Poland and the campaign in France, used a 20 mm autocannon as its main armament. Although ineffective against tank armour even during the early years of the war, the cannon was effective against light-skinned vehicles as well as infantry and was also used by armoured cars. Larger examples, such as the 40 mm Vickers S, were mounted in ground attack aircraft to serve as an anti-tank weapon, a role to which they were suited as tank armour is often lightest on top.

The Polish 20 mm 38 Fk auto cannon was expensive to produce, but an exception. Unlike the Oerlikon, it was effective against all the tanks fielded in 1939, largely because it was built as an upgrade to the Oerlikon, Hispano-Suiza, and Madsen. It even proved capable of knocking out early Panzer IIIs and IVs, albeit with great difficulty. Only 55 were produced by the time of the Polish Defensive War. However it was in the air war that these weapons played their most important part in the conflict.

During the First World War, rifle-calibre machine guns became the standard weapons of military aircraft. In the Second, several factors brought about their replacement by autocannon. During the inter-war years, aircraft underwent extensive evolution and the all-metal monoplane, pioneered as far back as the end of 1915, almost entirely replaced wood and fabric biplanes. At the same time as they began to be made from stronger materials, the machines also increased in speed, streamlining, power and size, and it began to be apparent that correspondingly more powerful weapons would be needed to counter them. Conversely, they were becoming much better able to carry exactly such larger and more powerful guns; the technology of which was in the meantime also developing, providing significantly improved rates of fire and reliability.

When the Second World War did break out, it was swiftly realised that the power of contemporary aircraft allowed armour plate to be fitted to protect the pilot and other vulnerable areas. This innovation proved highly effective against rifle-calibre machine gun rounds, which tended to ricochet off harmlessly. Similarly the introduction of self sealing fuel tanks provided reliable protection against these small projectiles. These new defenses, synergistically with the general robustness of new aircraft designs and of course their sheer speed, which made simply shooting them accurately in the first place far more difficult, entailed that it took a lot of such bullets and a fair amount of luck to cause them critical damage; but potentially a single cannon shell with a high-explosive payload could instantly sever essential structural elements, penetrate armour or open up a fuel tank beyond the capacity of self-sealing compounds to counter, even from fairly long range. (Instead of explosives, such shells could carry incendiaries, also highly effective at destroying planes, or a combination of explosives and incendiaries.) Thus by the end of the war, the fighter aircraft of almost all the belligerents mounted cannon of some sort, the only exception being the United States which in most cases favoured the Browning AN/M2 "light-barrel" .50 calibre heavy machine gun. A fighter equipped with these intermediate weapons in sufficient numbers was adequately armed to fulfill most of the Americans' combat needs aloft, as they tended to confront enemy fighters and other small planes far more often than large bombers; and as, in the earlier phases of the war, the Japanese aircraft they dealt with were not only unusually lightly built but went without either armour plate or self-sealing tanks in order to reduce their weight. Nevertheless, the U.S. also adopted planes fitted with autocannon, such as the Lockheed P-38 Lightning, despite experiencing technical difficulties with developing and manufacturing these large-calibre automatic guns.

Weapons such as the Oerlikon 20 mm, the Bofors 40 mm and various German Rheinmetall autocannons would see widespread use by both sides during the Second World War; not only in an anti-aircraft role, but as a weapon for use against ground targets as well. Heavier anti-aircraft cannon had difficulty tracking fast-moving aircraft and were unable to accurately judge altitude or distance, while machine guns possessed insufficient range and firepower to bring down aircraft consistently. Continued ineffectiveness against aircraft despite the large numbers installed during the second World War led, in the West, to the removal of almost all shipboard anti-aircraft weapons in the early post-war period. This was only reversed with the introduction of computer-controlled systems.

The German Luftwaffe deployed small numbers of the experimental Bordkanone series of heavy aircraft cannon in 37, 50 and 75 mm calibres, mounted in gun pods under the fuselage or wings. The 37 mm BK 3,7 cannon, based on the German Army's 3.7 cm FlaK 43 anti-aircraft autocannon was mounted in pairs in underwing gun pods on a small number of specialized Stuka Panzerknacker (tank buster) aircraft. The BK 5 cm cannon, based on the 5 cm KwK 39 cannon of the Panzer III, was installed in Ju 88P bomber destroyers, which also used other Bordkanone models, and in the Messerschmitt 410 Hornisse (Hornet) bomber destroyer. 300 examples of the BK 5 cannon were built, more than all other versions. The PaK 40 semi-automatic 7.5 cm calibre anti-tank gun was the basis for the BK 7,5 in the Junkers Ju 88 P-1 heavy fighter and Henschel Hs 129 B-3 twin engined ground attack aircraft.

The German Mauser MK 213 was developed at the end of the Second World War and is regarded as the archetypal modern revolver cannon. With multiple chambers and a single barrel, autocannons using the revolver principle can combine a very high rate of fire and high acceleration to its maximum firing rate with low weight, at cost of a reduced sustained rate of fire compared to rotary cannon. They are, therefore, used mainly in aircraft for AA purposes, in which a target is visible for a short period of time.

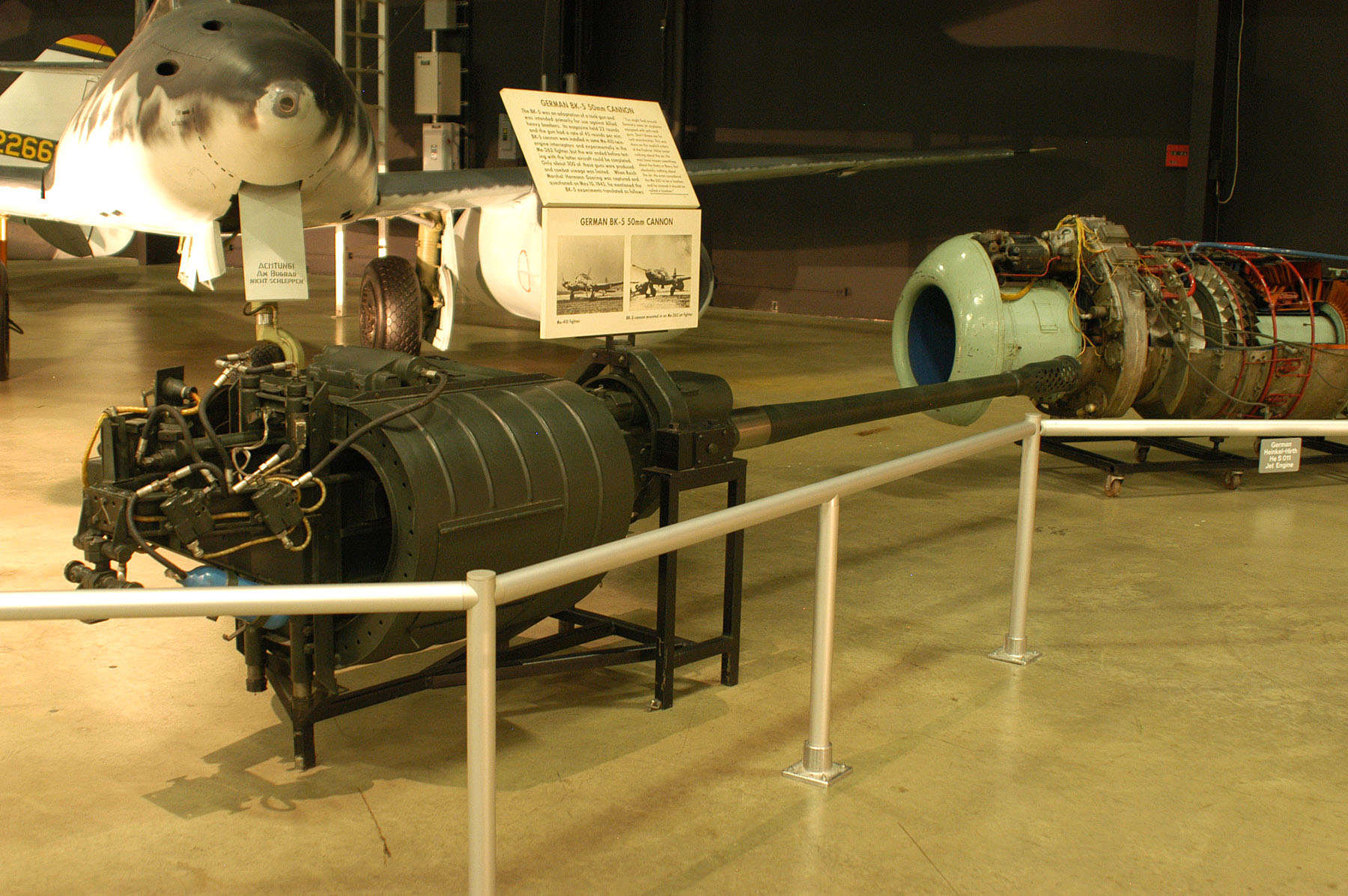
German BK 5 50 mm aircraft autocannon displayed in front of the Me 262A jet, a design once tested with it

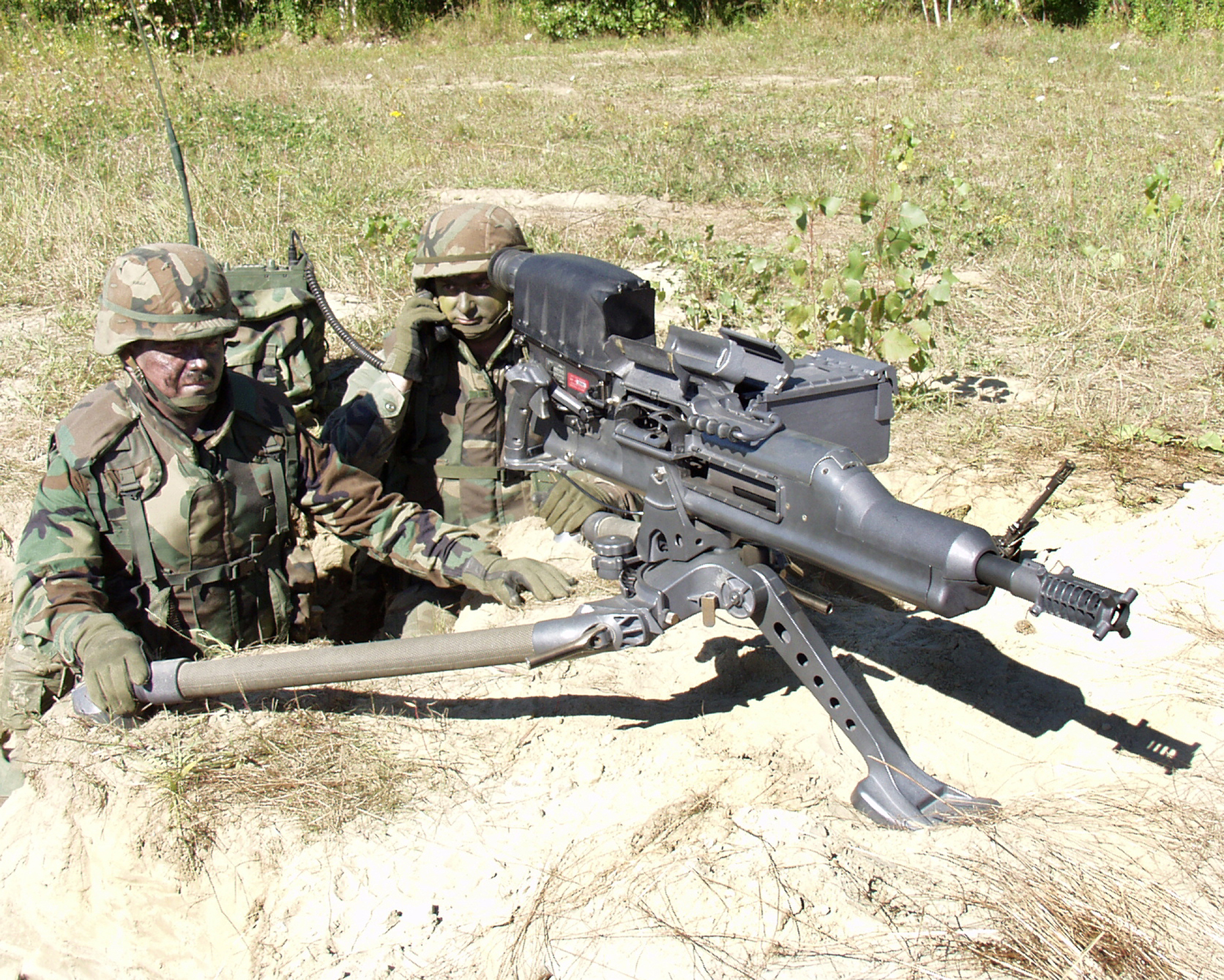
XM307 25 mm caliber man portable Automatic Grenade Launcher, part of the cancelled OCSW program

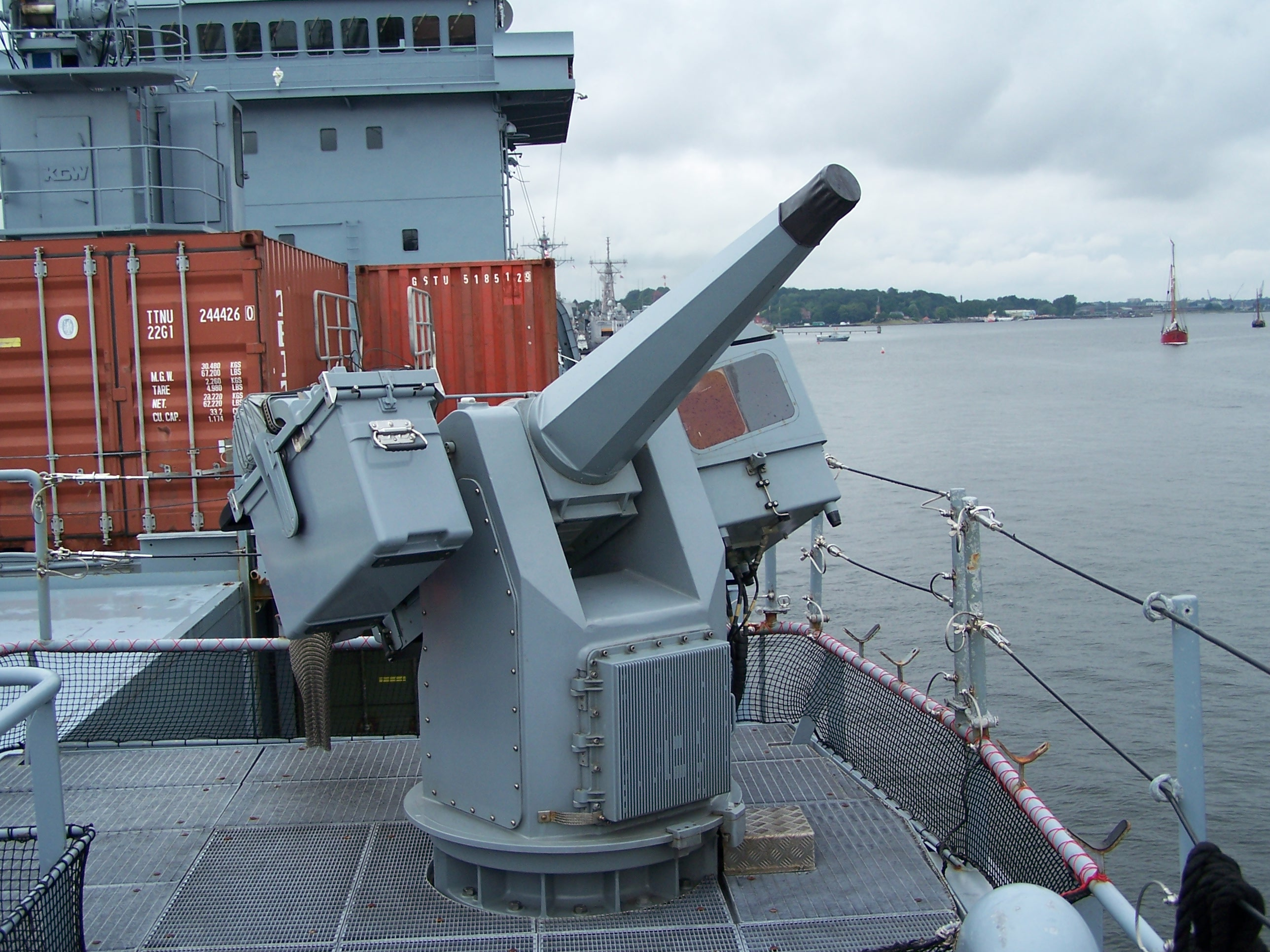
An MLG 27 remote controlled autocannon of the German Navy

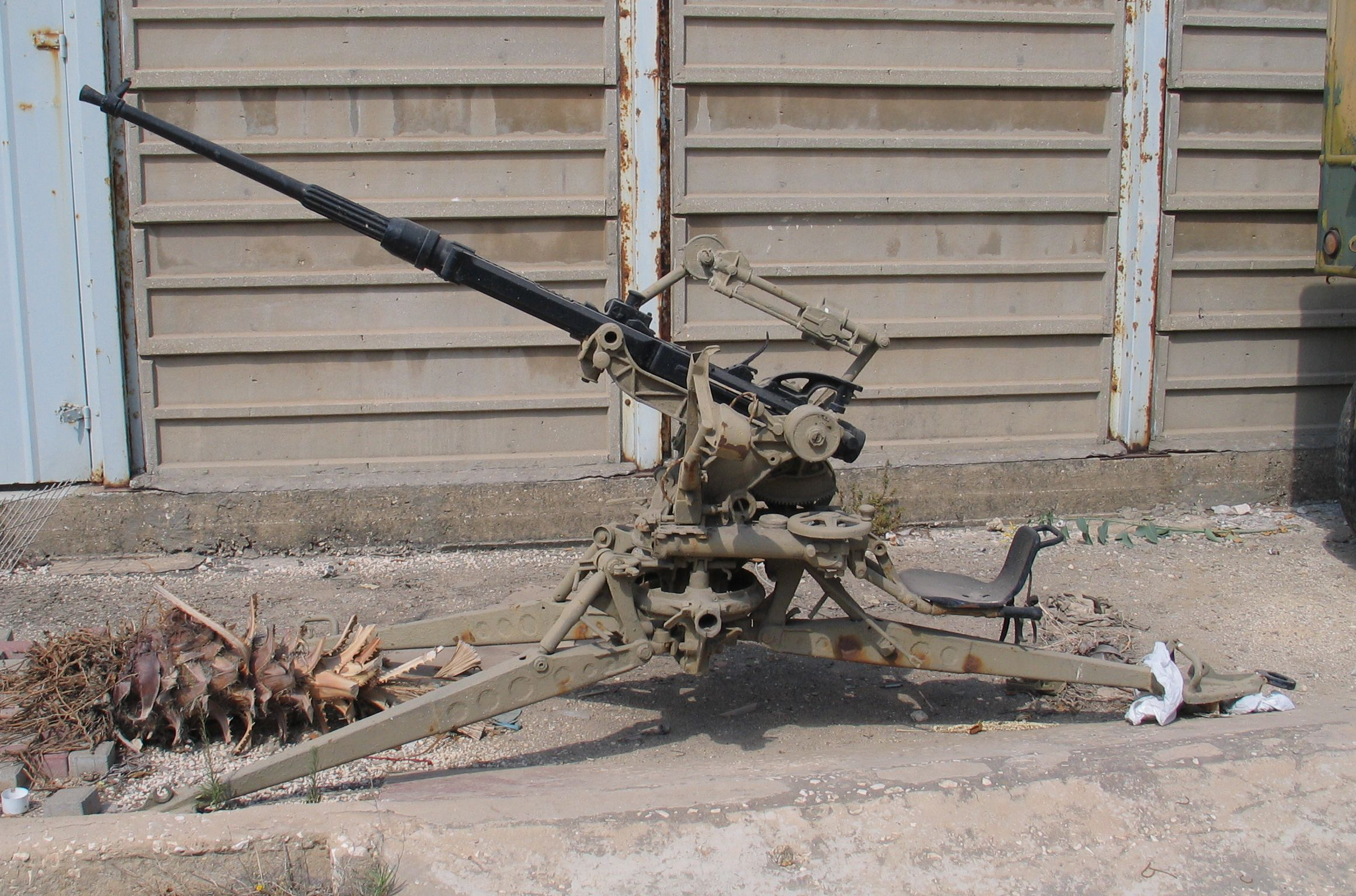
The 20 mm Oerlikon, an early autocannon

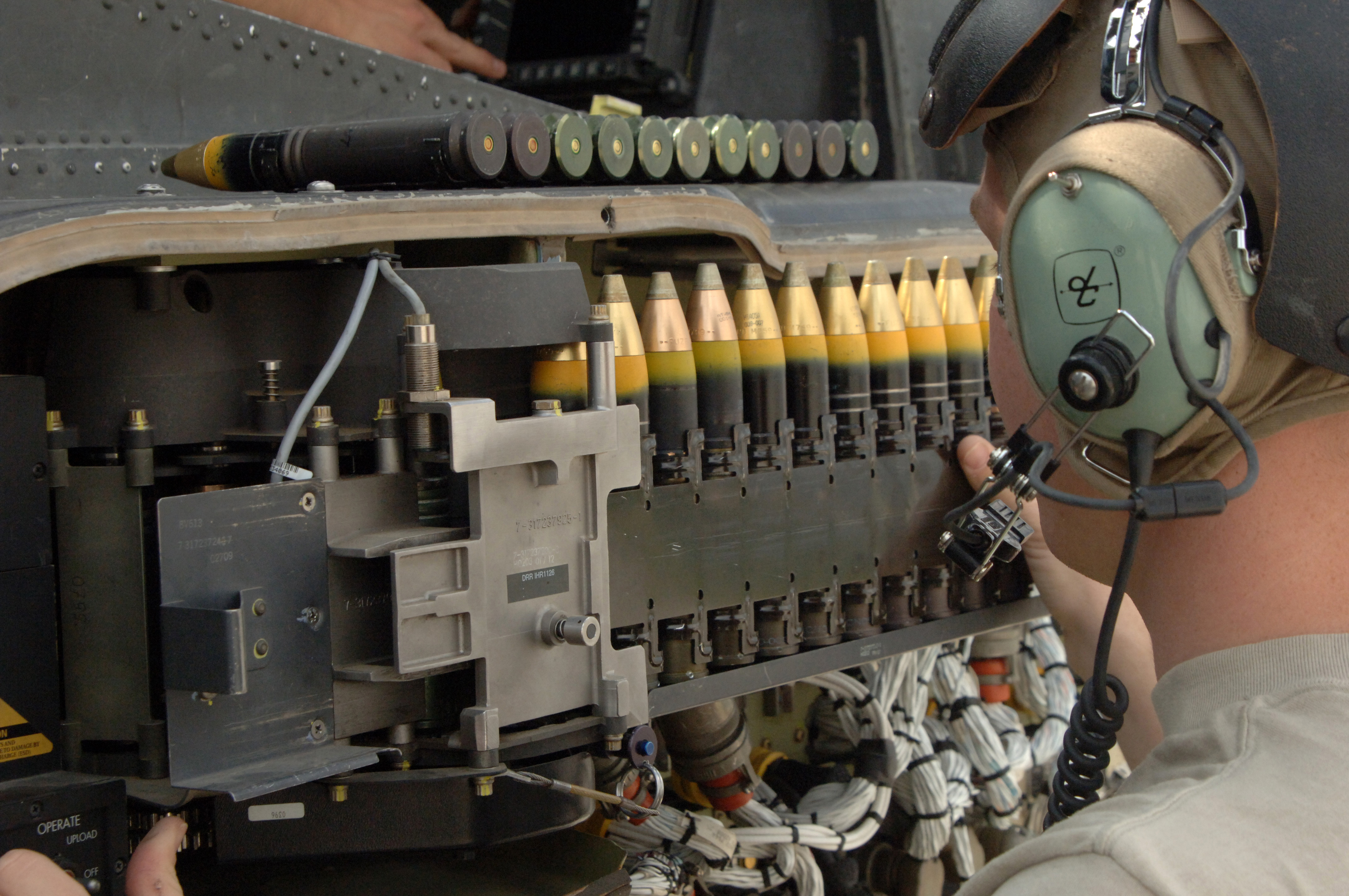
30mm × 113 mm rounds being loaded into a M230 chain gun

=== Modern era ===
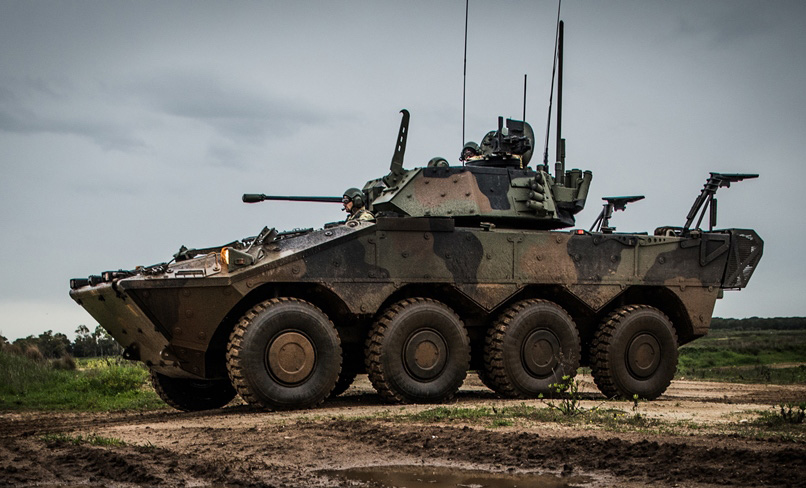
Oerlikon KBA automatic cannon turret on a IFV Freccia.

The development of guided missiles was thought to render cannons unnecessary, and a full generation of western fighter aircraft was built without them. In contrast, all Eastern Bloc aircraft kept their guns. During the Vietnam War, however, the United States Air Force realized that cannons were useful for firing warning shots and for attacking targets that did not warrant the expenditure of a (much more expensive) missile, and, more importantly, as an additional weapon if the aircraft had expended all its missiles or enemy aircraft were inside of the missiles' minimum target acquisition range in a high-G close range engagement. This was particularly important during the Vietnam War where the rules of engagement constrained pilots from engaging targets beyond visual range. As a consequence, fighters at the time had cannons added back in external "gun pods", and virtually all fighter aircraft retain autocannons in integral internal mounts to this day.

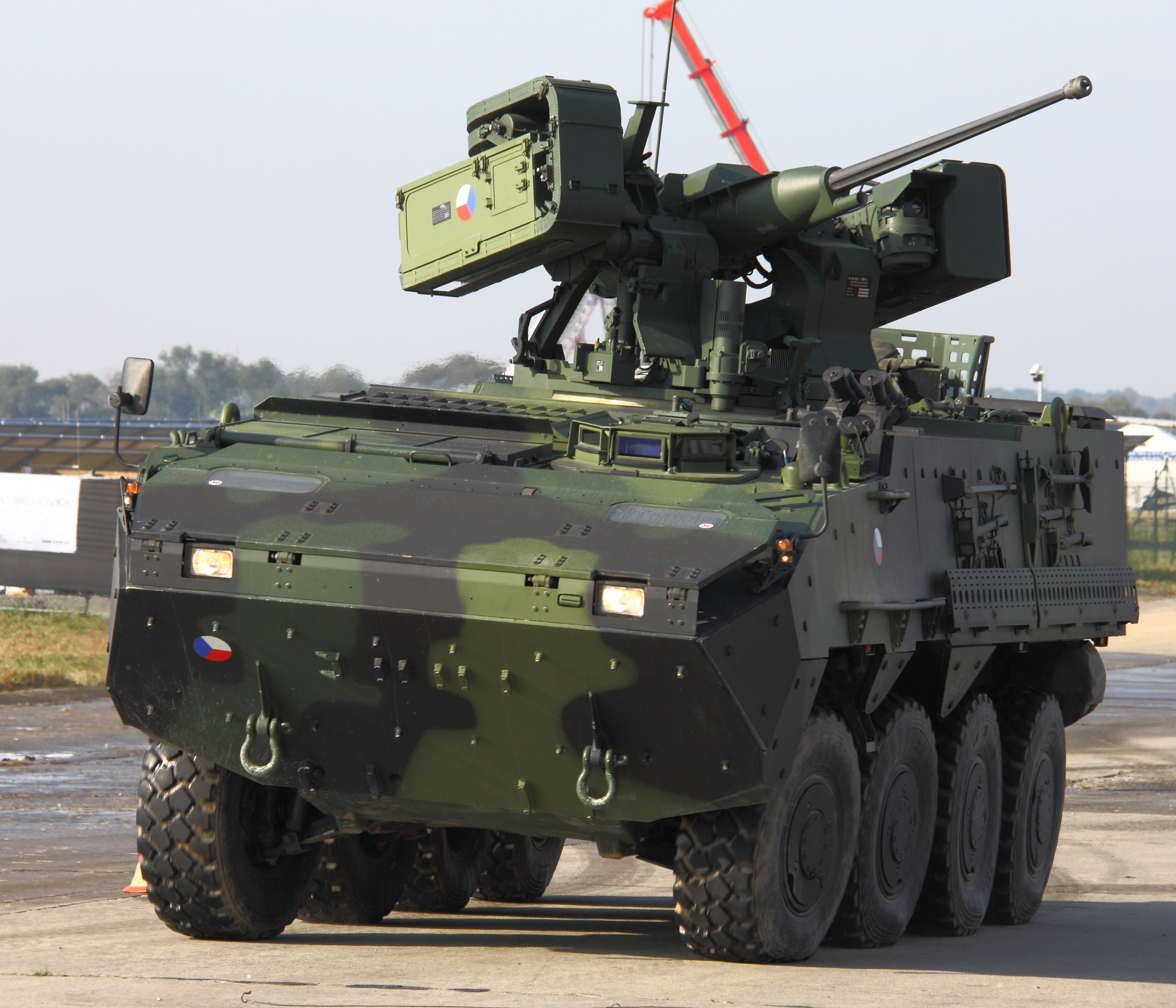
RCWS-30 automatic cannon turret on a Czech Pandur II

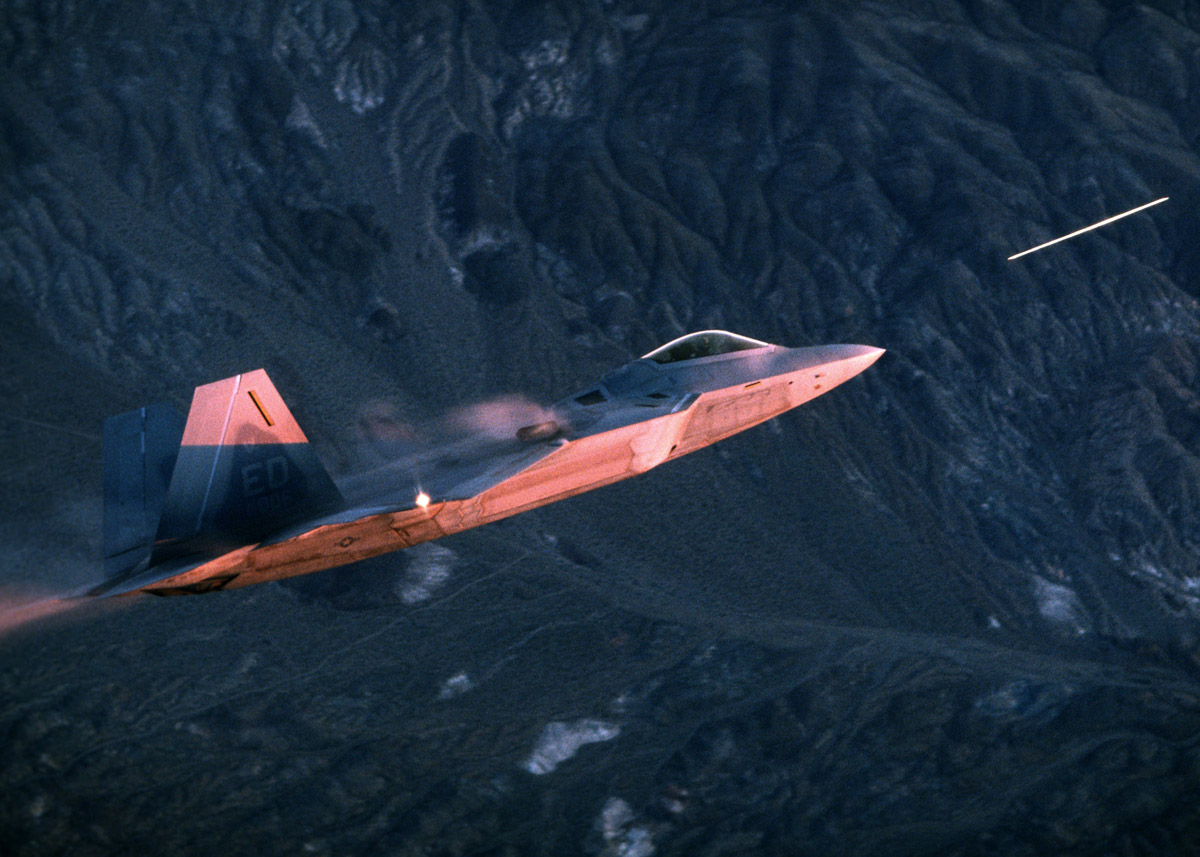
An F-22 firing its M61A2 rotary cannon

After the Second World War, autocannons continued to serve as a versatile weapon in land, sea, and air applications. Examples of modern autocannons include the 25 mm Oerlikon KBA mounted on the IFV Freccia, the M242 Bushmaster mounted on the M2/M3 Bradley, updated versions of the Bofors 40 mm gun, and the Mauser BK-27. The 20 mm M61A1 is an example of an electrically powered rotary autocannon. Another role that has come into association with autocannons are that of close-in weapon systems on naval vessels, which are used to destroy anti-ship missiles and low flying aircraft.

== See also ==
- Chain gun
- Gast gun
- Infantry support gun
- List of autocannon
- MG 18 TuF
- Nkm wz. 38 FK
- Recoil operation
- Revolver cannon
- Rotary cannon
- XM274
