= Baher anti-materiel rifle =

Baher
- Type: Anti-material rifle
- Place of origin: Iran

Specifications
- Mass: 62 Kg
- Cartridge: 23x152mm
- Caliber: 23mm
- Effective firing range: 4 km

Baher or Bahr (Persian: باهر) is an Iranian anti-materiel rifle designed to damage watchtowers, fortifications, aircraft, APC, IFV and radar systems.

== Design ==
The Baher has a long barrel to increase its muzzle energy, the standard version is mounted on a tripod. The trigger must be pulled to eject a case and to fire separately.

== Users ==
Iran

- The Islamic Republic of Iran Armed Forces use an improved version of the Baher, which utilizes a bipod instead of the tripod.

== See also ==
- Arash anti-materiel rifle – (Iran)
- Anzio 20mm rifle – (United States)
