= Raufoss Mk 211 =

.50 caliber (12.7×99mm NATO) ammunition type

The Raufoss Mk 211 projectile

The Raufoss Mk 211 is a .50 BMG (12.7×99mm NATO) multi-purpose anti-materiel high-explosive incendiary/armor-piercing ammunition projectile produced by Nammo under the model name NM140 MP. It is commonly referred to as multipurpose or Raufoss, meaning red waterfall in Norwegian. This refers to Nammo's precursor company Raufoss Ammunisjonsfabrikker, an ammunition manufacturer established 1896 in Raufoss, Norway. The "Mk 211" name comes from the nomenclature Mk 211 MOD 0 used by the U.S. military for this round.

== Design details ==
The multipurpose concept developed by Raufoss is unique in that, instead of using a mechanical fuse, it uses a pyrotechnical ignition train.

The multipurpose name is based on an armor-piercing tungsten core, a high explosive, and an incendiary component, thus making it capable of penetrating lightly armored targets and causing damage to personnel inside the target after penetration. It is a suitable round for engaging helicopters, aircraft and lightly armored vehicles, as well as unarmored vehicles, and it is capable of igniting jet fuel. The Mk 211 has about the same destructive power as a standard 20mm round against such targets and can penetrate 11 mm of RHA at 45° from a range of 1000 meters. The slower-burning deflagration action results in a characteristic fragmentation pattern with large pieces dispersed in a 30-degree cone.

The Mk 211 is a very popular .50 caliber sniper round used in the Barrett M82 rifle and other .50 BMG rifles. It is also often used in heavy machine guns such as the M2 Browning, but not the M85. Due to its popularity, several U.S. arms manufacturers produce the round under license from NAMMO Raufoss AS. However, due to the complex structure of the projectile and consequently high costs (≈ US$75 per round), the popularity is restricted to special mission profiles.

The Mk 211/NM140 is graded into two accuracy classes: Class A is match grade ammunition, while Class B is ordinary linked ammunition for machine gun use. Under the international (or Norwegian) NM nomenclature, revisions are indicated by a trailing "Fn", with "F3" being the current revision as of 2020. There is also a tracer variant, the Mk 30/NM160 in Norwegian service, used in the Browning heavy machine gun. The "DT" (IR tracer) variant called NM 263 is not used by the US.

== Identification ==
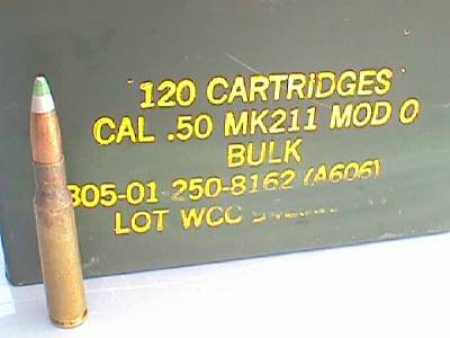
Mk 211 MOD 0, with green over white painted tip. The round pictured is made by the WCC in the US with a projectile probably produced by Nammo of Norway.

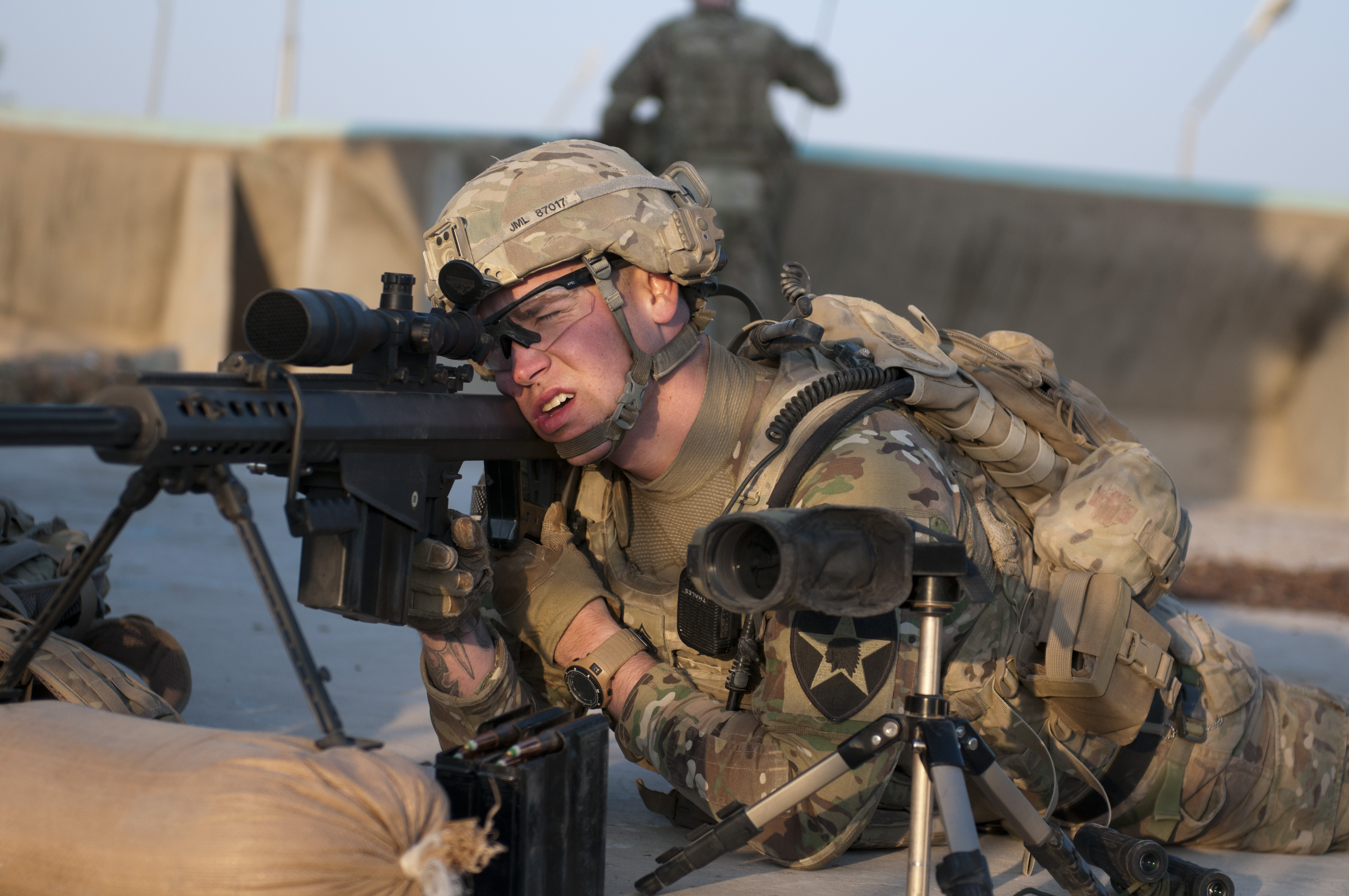
Loaded magazine for an M107 sniper/anti-materiel rifle

This round is usually identified by a green over white paint tip mark. Its tracer variant, which is typically only used with belt-fed machine guns in naval applications, includes a row of red paint between the green and white rows.

The headstamp on the casing will not help to identify the round as Raufoss. Common headstamps are used, and only designate the location, and year of final assembly of the completed round. Headstamps in general will read as (but are not limited to): HXP 89, WCC 94, LC 01 or FN 91. The two or three letter prefix (HXP, WCC, LC or FN) designates the place of assembly; the two-digit suffix numbers specify the production year.

== Legality ==
There has been much debate over whether the Mk 211 projectile is legal to use against personnel, or if it is strictly anti-materiel ammunition. The International Committee of the Red Cross has sought to have the ammunition banned, due to concern over the incendiary and explosive components and their effect on personnel. The Saint Petersburg Declaration of 1868 prohibits the "military or naval" use of explosive or incendiary projectiles with a mass of under 400 grams. That declaration does not govern the conduct of non-signatory parties, but the Hague Conventions of 1899 and 1907 – which superseded the St. Petersburg Declaration, and were signed by a far wider circle of nations – do permit the use of such ammunition for autocannons and heavy machine guns. Machine guns firing .50 cal./12.7mm ammunition are heavy machine guns. In principle, the ICRC's position can currently only be legally enforced against the group of nations that were parties to the St. Petersburg Declaration.

Trials conducted by the Forsvarets Forskningsinstitutt (Norwegian Defence Research Establishment) have concluded that the ammunition most likely does not have an unlawful effect if unintentionally used against personnel, as the round will have penetrated the body and exited on the other side before the explosive and incendiary components of the round are initiated. Upon hitting a person the round will detonate about 50% of the time; if the target is wearing body armor a higher detonation frequency is to be expected (as shown by the ICRC tests carried out in 1999). If detonated, the round will have a significant fragmentation and incendiary effect in a 30-degree cone behind the struck target, and this might affect others standing in the vicinity. The distance the round will travel from ignition to detonation is 30–40 cm, so if the target is hit at very specific angles the round may still be inside the target at the time of detonation.

The official stance of the Norwegian government is that the 12.7 mm MP round should not be used against personnel, but an exception has been made for snipers using the round due to the practical limitations of snipers having to change the type of ammunition used when switching between hardened and soft targets. It is being exported strictly in an anti-materiel capacity.

== See also ==
- Anti-materiel rifle
- High-explosive incendiary/armor-piercing ammunition (HEIAP)
- 20×102mm M940
- .50 BMG
- Mine shell
- XM307 Advanced Crew Served Weapon
- Neopup PAW-20
- Barrett XM109
- Grenade launcher
- STK 50MG
