= High-explosive incendiary/armor-piercing ammunition =

Multi-effect and multi-purpose ammunition type

Raufoss Mk 211

High-explosive incendiary/armor-piercing ammunition (HEIAP) is a form of shell which combines armor-piercing capability and a high-explosive effect. In this respect it is a modern version of an armor-piercing shell. The ammunition may also be called semi-armor-piercing high-explosive incendiary (SAPHEI).

Typical of a modern HEIAP shell is the Raufoss Mk 211 designed for weapons such as heavy machine guns and anti-materiel rifles.

The primary purpose of these munitions is armor penetration with better beyond-armor effects. Similarly to SLAP rounds (saboted light armor penetrator) which get their armor-piercing ability from the propulsion of a 7.62 mm tungsten heavy alloy bullet from a 12.7 mm barrel (.50 caliber) using a sabot with much more energy than is usually possible from a 7.62 mm round, HEIAP munitions utilize a similar theory with an added explosive effect at the end. The special effect is developed when the round strikes the target. The initial collision ignites the incendiary material in the tip, triggering the detonation of the HE charge. The second (zirconium powder) incendiary charge will also ignite. This burns at a very high temperature, is not easily extinguished, and can last up to 15 minutes.

The remaining element of the round is the tungsten carbide penetrator. This has a large amount of kinetic energy and will penetrate the armor as a solid-cored armor-piercing shot would. This takes the incendiary material and about 20 steel fragments (created by the explosives), delivering them in a 25–30 degree cone through the armor, increasing lethality.

The triggering of the explosive charge is dependent upon the resistance of the target. If the target offers little resistance then the lack of frictional heating will prevent the incendiary from igniting and the high explosive from detonating.

Exploding ammunition was used by both Allied and German forces during World War II.

== See also ==
- High explosive incendiary
- Mine shell
- Traveling charge
