= Barrett Optical Ranging System =

Barrett Optical Ranging System (BORS)
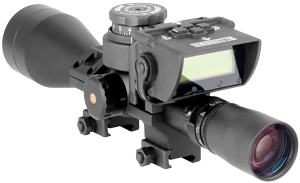
- The BORS mounted atop a scope.
- Place of origin: United States

Production history
- Manufacturer: Barrett Firearms Manufacturing
- Unit cost: $1,399 - $1,750 MSRP
- Produced: 2008 - approx. 2018

Specifications
- Mass: 13 oz (370 g)
- Length: 2.49 in (6.3 cm)
- Width: 3.25 in (8.3 cm)
- Height: 2.49 in (6.3 cm)

The Barrett Optical Ranging System (BORS) was an integrated ballistics computer manufactured by Barrett Firearms that aids snipers and long-range marksmen in taking precise and accurate shots. The system mounts directly to the riflescope.

== Design and features ==
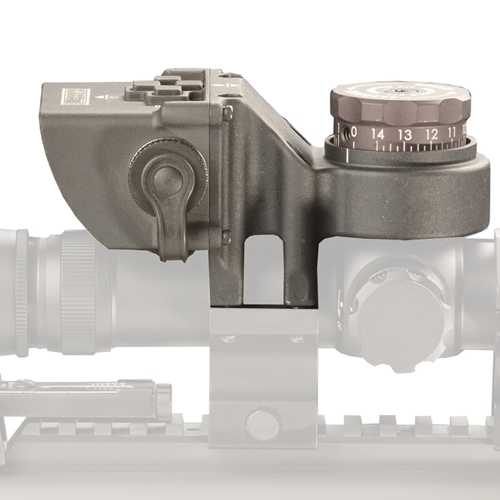
The BORS mounted atop a Leupold Mark 4 M1.

The computer built into the BORS, constantly updates to account for changing factors. Barrett states that the BORS "instantly takes care of the data work so the shooter can focus on the task of putting lead on target".

== Use ==
The BORS is also available for civilian sale and can be used by long-range marksmen including target shooters and hunters. The BORS was used by Ukrainian forces in the 2022 Russian invasion of Ukraine, a unit fitted onto a Barrett M107A1 rifle was captured by Russian forces.

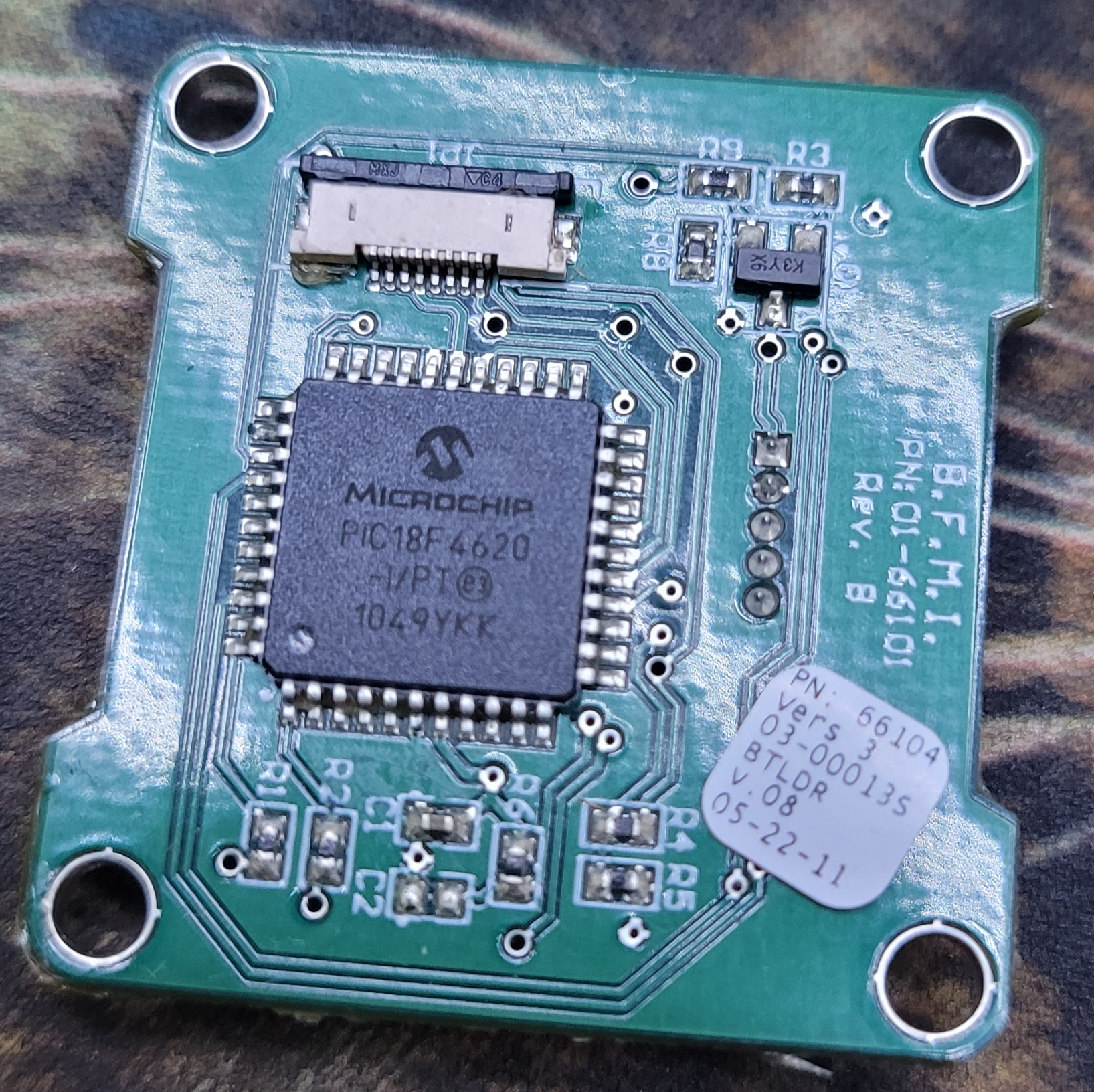
Barrett BORS main circuit board with chip info displayed on chip and sticker.

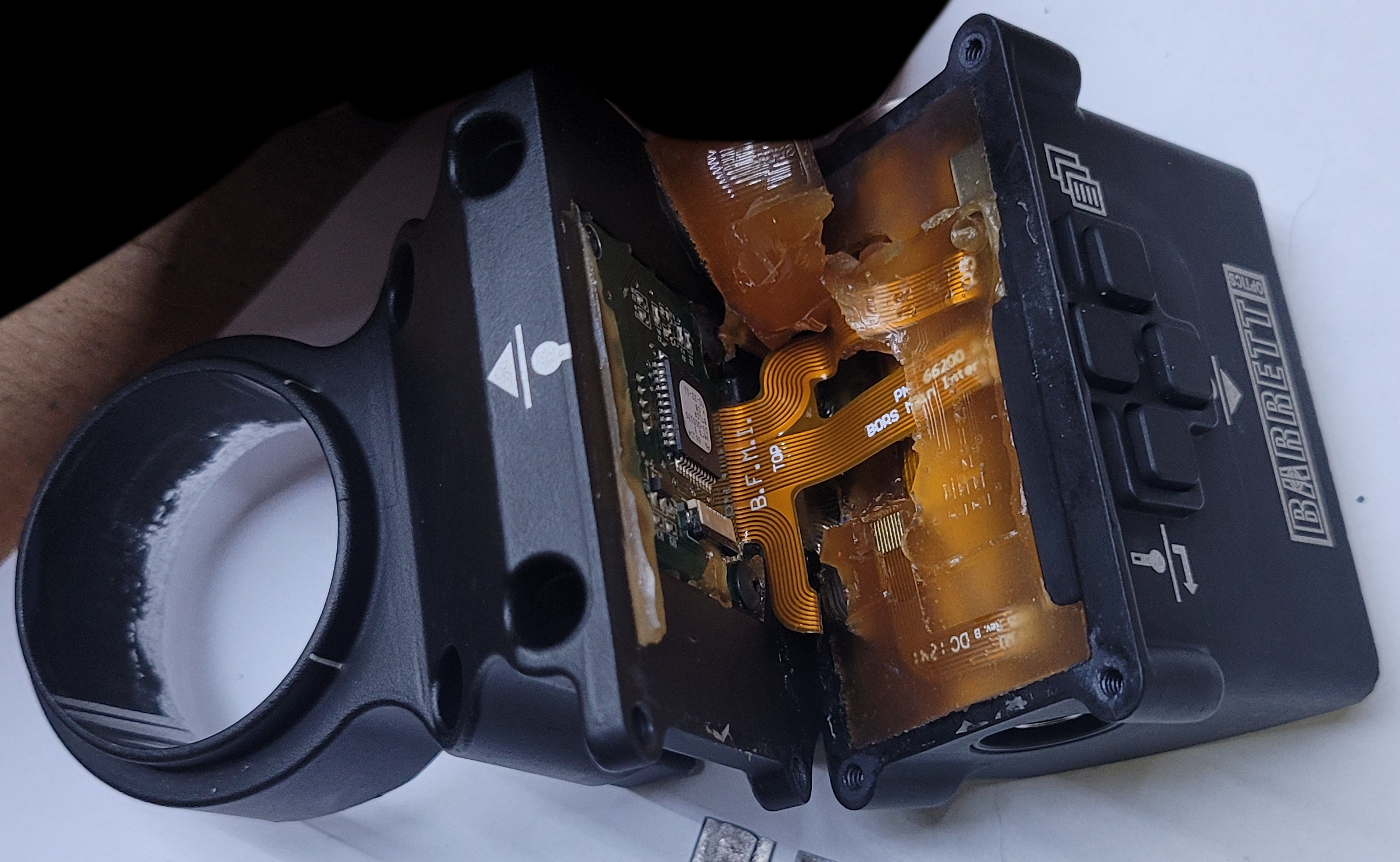
Barrett BORS being disassembled and split in half exposing its internal parts and protective gel.

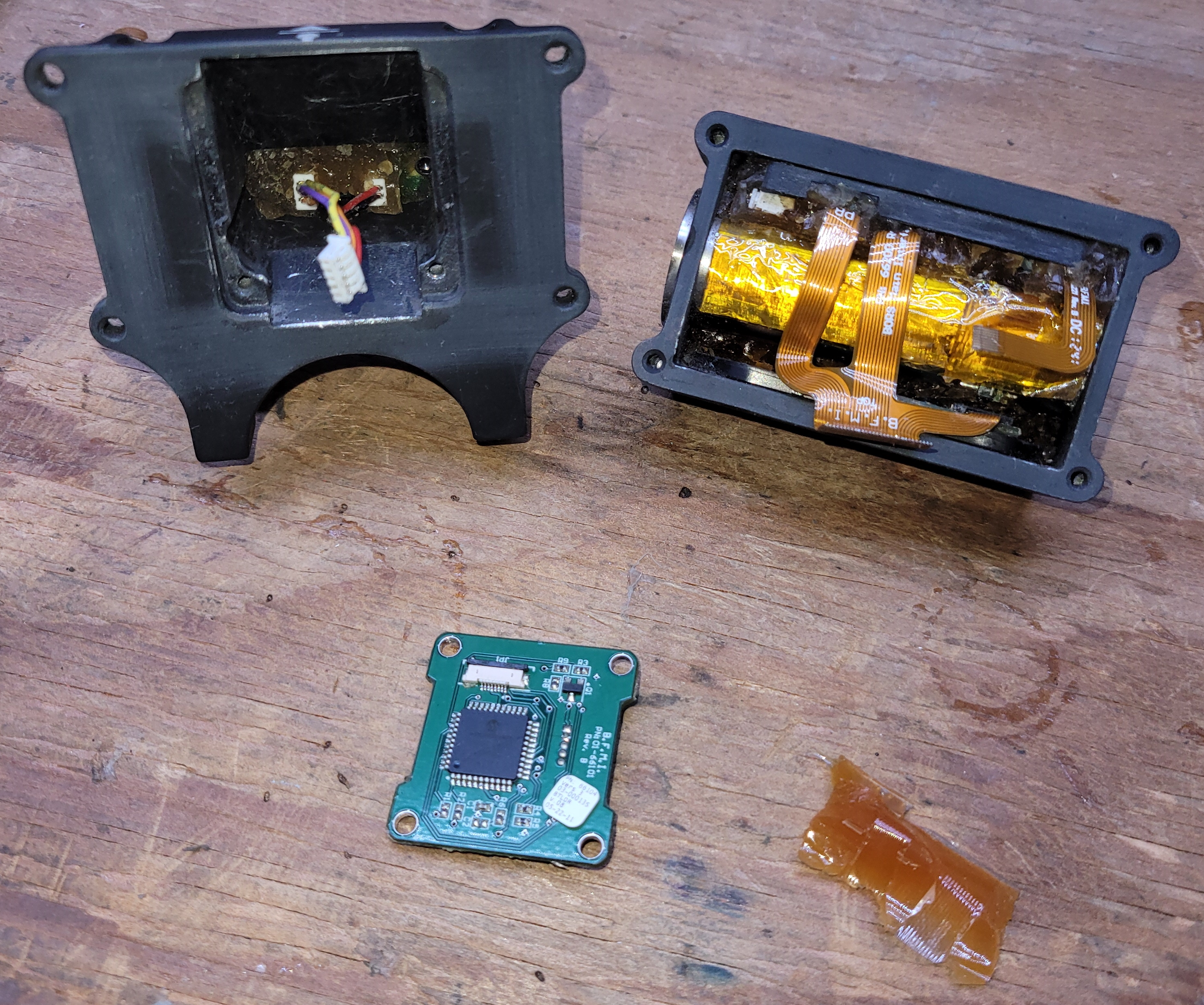
Barrett BORS disassembled with the protective gel removed. (Shown bottom right)
