= 25 mm grenade =

Grenade launcher ammunition

25mm Grenade
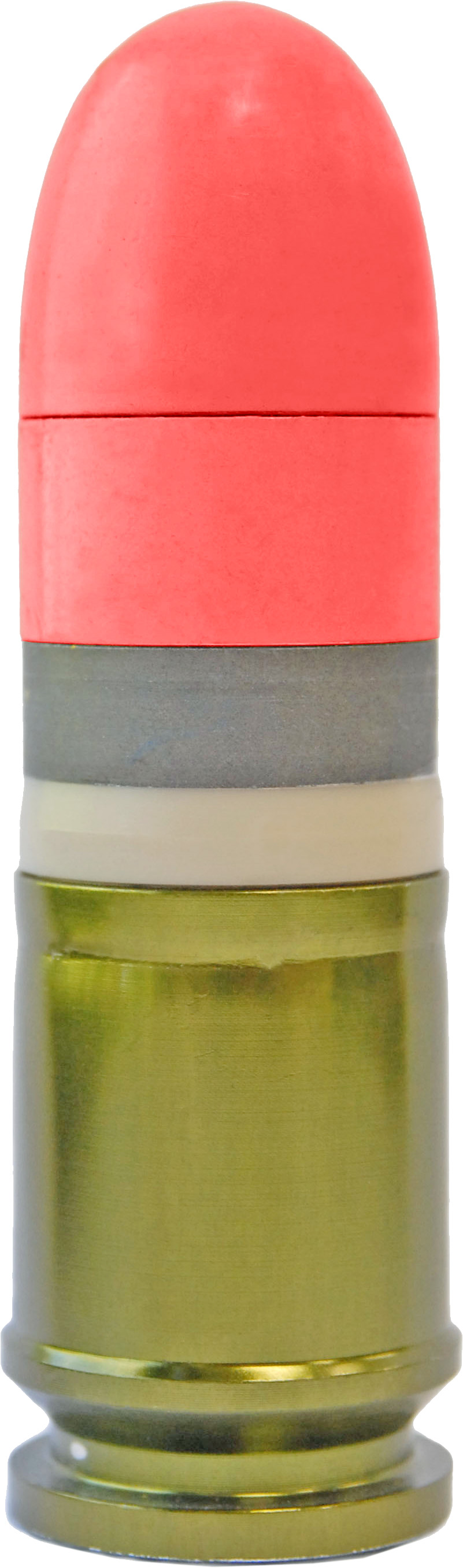
- Armor-piercing ammunition for XM25

The 25 mm grenade is a type of explosive ordnance used in some modern grenade launchers. 25 mm grenades are armed after launch, after traveling a safe distance. Many types explode on impact, but others are designed to explode in mid-air after traveling a certain distance—used to clear entrenched or barricaded positions.

Examples of weapons designed to launch 25 mm grenades are the experimental XM25, the Barrett XM109 payload rifle, and the XM307 ACSW. The original use for this round was for the OCSW, now known as the XM307 ACSW. Later, a low velocity variant of the OCSW round was chosen for the XM25, which is derived from the XM29 OICW.

There are two different versions of the 25mm grenade: the 25×40mm low-velocity round developed for the XM25, and the 25×59mm high-velocity round developed for the XM109 and XM307.

== See also ==
- 25 mm caliber
