= XM307 Advanced Crew Served Weapon =

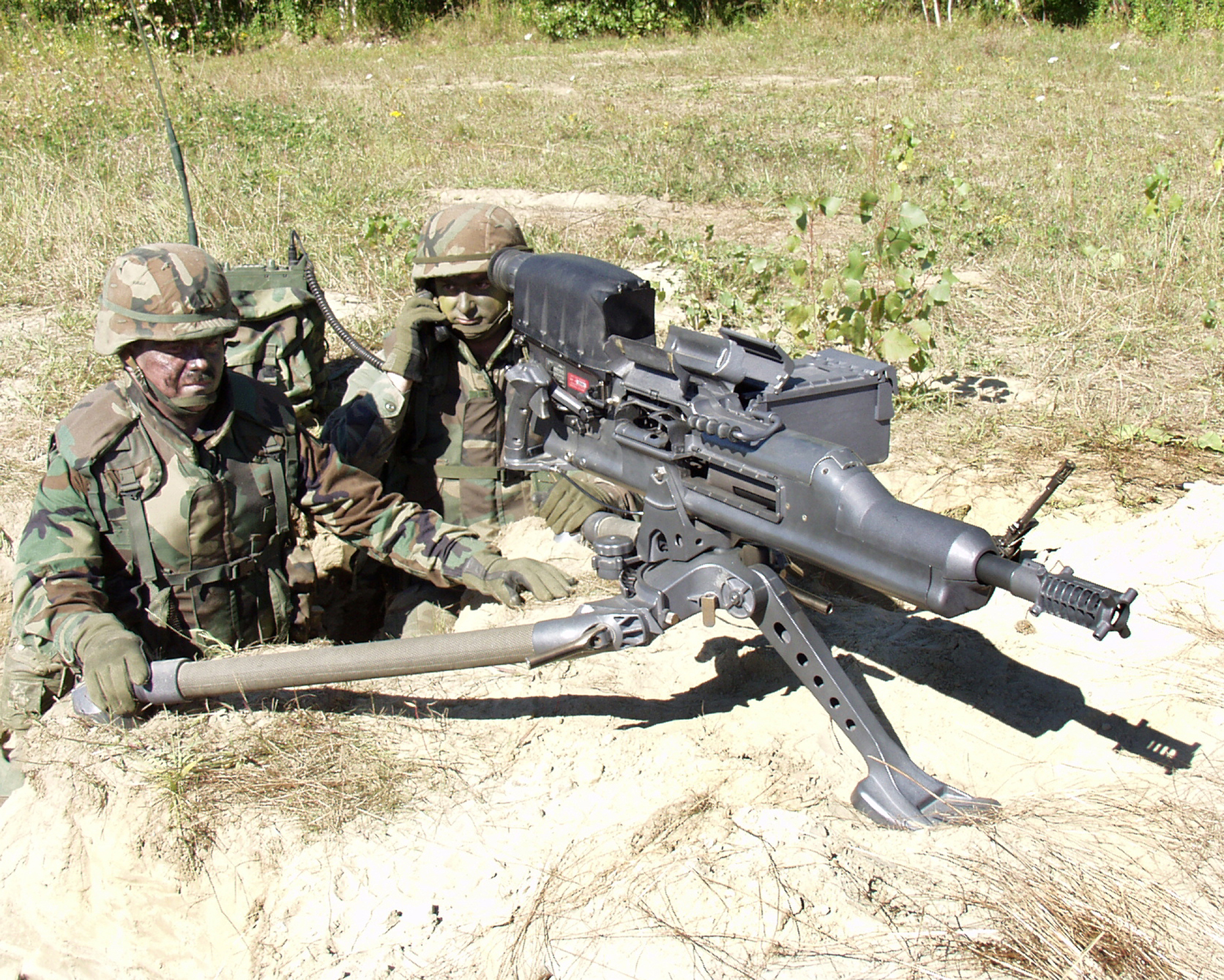
- Typical operation routine
- Type: Automatic Grenade Launcher
- Place of origin: United States

Production history
- Manufacturer: (Prime Contractor) General Dynamics Armament and Technical Products
- Variants: XM312

Specifications
- Mass: 50-80* lbs (22.7 kg) (Gun, mount, and fire control)*With ammo
- Length: 1,326 mm (52.2 in)
- Barrel length: 638 mm (25.1 in)
- Crew: 2 men
- Caliber: 25 x 59 mm
- Action: Gas operated, rotating bolt
- Rate of fire: 250 rounds per minute
- Effective firing range: Lethal and Suppressive out to 2,187.2 yd (2,000 m)
- Maximum firing range: 3,937 yd (3,600 m)
- Feed system: Weapon-Mountable 31-Round Ammunition Can (Right or Left Feed), belt fed
- Sights: Grenade Launcher: computerized with viewfinder Machine Gun: fixed rear iron

The XM307 Advanced Crew Served Weapon (ACSW) was a developmental 25 mm belt-fed automatic grenade launcher with programmable airburst capability. It is the result of the OCSW or Objective Crew Served Weapon project. It is lightweight and designed to be two-man portable, as well as vehicle mounted. The XM307 can kill or suppress enemy combatants out to 2,000 meters (2,187 yd), and destroy lightly armored vehicles, watercraft, and helicopters at 1,000 meters (1,094 yd). The project was canceled in 2007.

== Overview ==
The system was under development by General Dynamics Armament and Technical Products for the U.S. Army Tank-Automotive and Armaments Command (TACOM). As a part of the Small Arms Master Plan (SAMP) program, it is intended to either replace or supplement the Mk19 automatic grenade launcher and the M2 heavy machine gun. It fires 25 mm point-detonating and air burst style ammunition, including HE, and HEAT at a cyclic rate of 260 rounds per minute and has an effective range up to 2 kilometers.

The primary feature of the XM307 is its attenuated recoil system. The weapon controls recoil to a degree that a large tripod and heavy sandbags are not required to effectively employ this weapon. Because of its reduced recoil impulse and light weight, other mounting options are possible, such as small unmanned vehicles and aircraft. The XM307's airburst rounds make it much easier to bypass walls protecting enemies that could cause collateral damage if fired upon directly. Operators do not have to shoot through the wall, just through an opening or over the top to kill the people behind the cover, leaving the structure of the building intact. An additional feature of the XM307 is that it can be converted into the XM312, a 12.7 mm (.50)-caliber version for infantry and light anti-armor support in under two minutes (1 minute, 42 seconds).

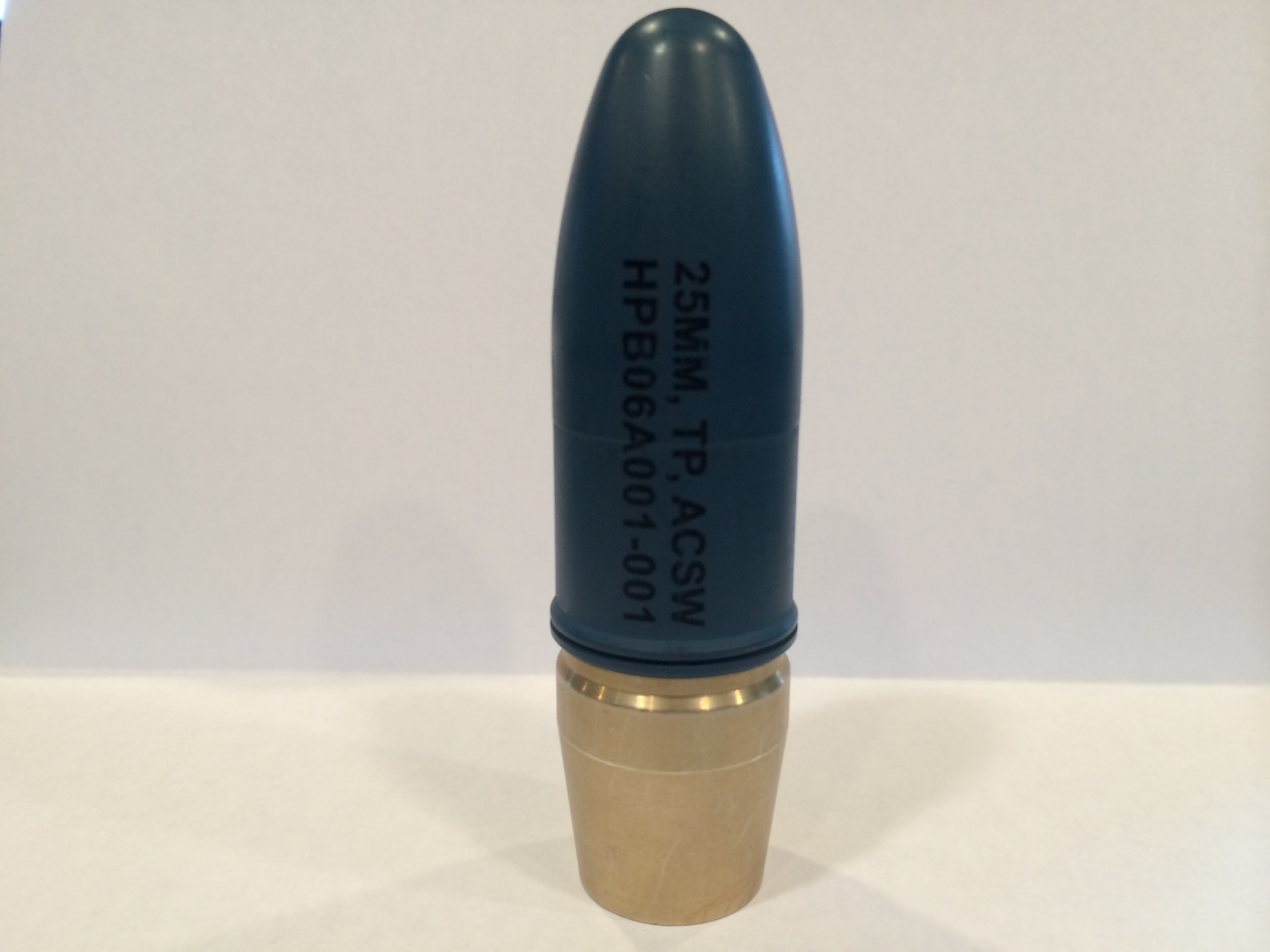
25mm Training Practice projectile.

== Specifications ==
System

- Weight: 50 lb (22.5 kg) (gun, mount, and fire control)
- Fire Control: full solution, day/night
- Portability: two-man portable and vehicle mountable
- Stability: up to 18 inch (457 mm) tripod height
- Environmental: operationally insensitive to conditions

Gun

- Dimensions: 9.9 W × 7.2 H × 52.3 L max inches (43.3 L charged) / 251 mm × 183 mm × 1328 mm (1100 mm charged)
- Rate of Fire: 250 rounds per minute, automatic
- Dispersion: less than 1.5 mils, one sigma radius
- Range: lethal and suppressive out to 2,000 m
- Ammunition: high-explosive airbursting, armor-piercing, and training ammunition (HE, AP, TP, TP-S)
- Feed System: weapon-mountable ammunition can (left feed)

== Variants ==
A Remotely Operated Variant (ROV) for the Future Combat Systems family of vehicles is also under development. The weapon system, which would be mounted on the vehicle, will be remotely operated from within the vehicle.

== Program status ==
In May 2004, the development phase was funded until 2007. In December 2005 funding was granted for a remote-control vehicle variant. However, in 2007 the project was canceled due to the low rate of fire of the prototypes.

== See also ==
- LAG 40 grenade launcher, an automatic grenade launcher used by Spain
- Vektor Y3 AGL, an automatic grenade launcher of South African origin
- Heckler & Koch GMG, a 40 mm automatic grenade launcher used by the German Army and other European armed forces
- XM174 grenade launcher
- AGS-30, a similar weapon, 30mm calibre
- XM312, a .50 BMG version of the XM307
- Mk 47, a similar but older automatic 40 mm grenade launcher, also replacing the Mk 19 in some roles.
- XM25 CDTE, a 25mm low-velocity smart cannon/grenade launcher for an individual soldier
- XM29 OICW
- Comparison of automatic grenade launchers
- Raufoss Mk 211
