= Isserlis =

Isserlis, Isserles or Iserles, and Isserlin, Isserlen or Isserlein are patronymic Yiddish surnames, originating in Ashkenazic and Sephardic rabbinical families. The name is derived from French or German diminutive variations of the Hebrew given name Israel. It may refer to the following notable people:

- Arieh Iserles (born 1947), computational mathematician
- Eleanor Isserlis (born Eleanor Mary Ord Laurie, 1919–2009), was a British mammalogist
- Julius Isserlis (1888–1968), Russian pianist and composer, grandfather of Steven Isserlis
- Inbali Iserles, writer of juvenile fantasy novels under the pseudonym Erin Hunter
- Israel Isserlein (1390–1460), Talmudist and halakhist from Austria
- Leon Isserlis (1881–1966), Russian-born British statistician
  - Isserlis's theorem, a formula in probability theory named after Leon Isserlis
- Moses Isserles (1530–1572), Polish Ashkenazic rabbi and Talmudist
- Steven Isserlis (born 1958), British cellist
