= Alexander Chuprov =

Alexander Chuprov may refer to:

- Alexander Ivanovich Chuprov (1841–1908), Russian professor of political economy and statistics at Moscow University
- Alexander Alexandrovich Chuprov (1874–1926), his son, Russian statistician and professor at the St. Petersburg Polytechnical Institute
