= Gian Carlo Wick =

Italian theoretical physicist (1909–1992)

- Born: 15 October 1909; Turin, Kingdom of Italy
- Died: 20 April 1992 (aged 82); Turin, Italy
- Known for: Electron capture Superselection; Wick ordering Wick product Wick rotation Wick's theorem
- Awards: Heineman Prize (1967); Matteucci Medal (1980)
- Scientific career
- Fields: Physics (theoretical)
- Doctoral advisor: Gleb Wataghin

Gian Carlo Wick (15 October 1909 – 20 April 1992) was an Italian theoretical physicist who made important contributions to quantum field theory. The Wick rotation, Wick contraction, Wick's theorem, and the Wick product are named after him.

== Life ==
Gian Carlo Wick, first name "Gian Carlo", was born in Turin, Italy in 1909. Wick's father was a Latinist and Greekist, and his mother, Barbara Allason (1877–1968), was a well-known Italian writer and anti-fascist. His paternal grandfather had emigrated from Switzerland to Italy and his grandmother from Austria.

In 1930 Wick received his doctoral degree in Turin under Gleb Wataghin with a thesis on the electronic theory of metals. He then went to Göttingen and Leipzig to further his study of physics. One of the professors he got to know there was Werner Heisenberg. Heisenberg liked the young Italian theoretician—they shared a common interest in classical music—and treated him with an affection that Wick never forgot. Once a week, Heisenberg had invited Wick and other students to his home for spirited evenings of talk and Ping-Pong.

Wick became Enrico Fermi's assistant in Rome in 1932. In 1937 he became a professor of theoretical physics in Palermo and then in Padua before returning to Rome in 1940 to become chair of theoretical physics. In 1946 he followed Fermi to the United States, first to the University of Notre Dame, then to Berkeley. Wick refused to subscribe to a controversial oath during the McCarthy era, so he was fired at Berkeley and went to the Carnegie Institute of Technology in Pittsburgh in 1951. He remained there until 1957, interrupted by stays at the Institute for Advanced Study in Princeton and at CERN in Geneva. In 1957 he became chief of the theory department at Brookhaven National Laboratory. In 1965 he became a tenured professor at Columbia University in New York City, where he collaborated with Tsung-Dao Lee; after his retirement from Columbia he worked at the Scuola Normale Superiore in Pisa.

In 1967 he received the Dannie Heineman Prize. In 1968 he received the first Ettore Majorana Prize. He was a member of the United States National Academy of Sciences and the Accademia dei Lincei.

Wick was an avid mountain climber. He was twice married and had two sons.

== Work ==
As a member of Fermi's group in Rome, Wick calculated the magnetic moment of the hydrogen molecule with group-theoretical methods. He extended Fermi's theory of beta decay to positron emission and K-capture, and explained the relationship between the range of a force and the mass of its force carrier particle. He also worked on slowing down neutrons in matter. He joined a group of Italian physicists led by Gilberto Bernardini which made the first measurement of the lifetime of the muon.

While in the United States, Wick made fundamental contributions to quantum field theory, such as the Wick theorem in 1950, which showed how to express calculations in quantum field theory in terms of normally-ordered products and thus derive Feynman rules. He also introduced the Wick rotation, in which computations are analytically continued from Minkowski space to four-dimensional Euclidean space using a coordinate change to imaginary time. He developed the helicity formulation for collisions between particles with arbitrary spin, worked with Geoffrey Chew on the impulse approximation, and worked on meson theory, symmetry principles in physics, and the vacuum structure of quantum field theory.

== Selected bibliography ==
- Wick, G. C. (1933). "Über die Wechselwirkung zwischen Neutronen und Protonen". Zeitschrift für Physik (in German). 84 (11–12). Springer Science and Business Media LLC: 799–800. Bibcode:1933ZPhy...84..799W. doi:10.1007/bf01330504. ISSN 1434-6001.
- Wick, G. C. (15 October 1950). "The Evaluation of the Collision Matrix". Physical Review. 80 (2). American Physical Society (APS): 268–272. Bibcode:1950PhRv...80..268W. doi:10.1103/physrev.80.268. ISSN 0031-899X.
- Wick, G. C. (15 November 1954). "Properties of Bethe-Salpeter Wave Functions". Physical Review. 96 (4). American Physical Society (APS): 1124–1134. Bibcode:1954PhRv...96.1124W. doi:10.1103/physrev.96.1124. ISSN 0031-899X. (introduced the Wick rotation.)
- Wick, G. C. (1 October 1955). "Introduction to Some Recent Work in Meson Theory". Reviews of Modern Physics. 27 (4). American Physical Society (APS): 339–362. Bibcode:1955RvMP...27..339W. doi:10.1103/revmodphys.27.339. ISSN 0034-6861.
- Jacob, M.; Wick, G.C. (1959). "On the general theory of collisions for particles with spin". Annals of Physics. 7 (4). Elsevier BV: 404–428. Bibcode:1959AnPhy...7..404J. doi:10.1016/0003-4916(59)90051-x. ISSN 0003-4916.
- Wick, G. -C.; Wightman, A. S.; Wigner, Eugene P. (15 June 1970). "Superselection Rule for Charge". Physical Review D. 1 (12). American Physical Society (APS): 3267–3269. Bibcode:1970PhRvD...1.3267W. doi:10.1103/physrevd.1.3267. ISSN 0556-2821.
- Lee, T. D.; Wick, G. C. (15 April 1974). "Vacuum stability and vacuum excitation in a spin-0 field theory". Physical Review D. 9 (8). American Physical Society (APS): 2291–2316. Bibcode:1974PhRvD...9.2291L. doi:10.1103/physrevd.9.2291. ISSN 0556-2821.
