= Rampone =

Rampone is a surname. Notable people with the surname include:

- Christie Rampone (born 1975), American women's soccer defender
- Salvatore Rampone (born 1962), Italian scientist and bodybuilder
