= List of Feynman diagrams =

List with diagrams of common Feynman diagrams

This is a list of common Feynman diagrams. His first published diagram appeared in Physical Review in 1949. Unless otherwise specified, the shown diagrams can assumed to be the leading order representation of the interaction.

== Standard model diagrams ==
Name or phenomenon	Interaction Type	Description	Diagram
Beta- decay and Free neutron decay	Decay	In beta decay, a beta particle is emitted from an atomic nucleus, and the nucleus gains a proton in place of the neutron. In free neutron decay, a neutron not bound to a nucleus (i.e. free) decays with the same process and products.	
Double beta decay	Decay	Two beta decays occurring simultaneously. While this can be considered two independent interactions, some nuclides are observed to decay in this way due to energetic reasons.	Leading order Feynman diagram for ordinary double beta decay
Compton scattering	Scattering	scattering of a photon by a charged particle. Here shown scattering with an electron. There are two channels of the leading order interaction. s-channel is shown above, and u-channel below.	
Pair production and annihilation	Other	In the Stückelberg–Feynman interpretation, pair annihilation is the same process as pair production. Here it is shown as occurring with an electron, but similar diagrams may be considered with other particles such as muons and protons.	
Møller scattering	Scattering	electron-electron scattering	
Bhabha scattering	Scattering	electron-positron scattering	
Penguin diagram	Other	a quark changes flavor via a W or Z loop	
Tadpole diagram	Other	One loop diagram with one external leg	
Self-interaction or oyster diagram	Other	An electron emits and reabsorbs a photon	
Box diagram	Other	The box diagram for kaon oscillations	
Box diagram	Scattering	Photon-photon scattering	
Higgs boson production	Other	Via gluons and top quarks	
Higgs boson production	Other	Via quarks and W or Z bosons	
Primakoff effect	Other	production of neutral pseudoscalar mesons by photons interacting with an atomic nucleus	
Delbrück scattering	Scattering	deflection of high-energy photons in the Coulomb field of nuclei	
Deep inelastic scattering	Scattering	a lepton is deflected by a virtual photon emitted by a quark from the hadron	
Chiral anomaly	Other	Anomaly-induced neutral pion decay $\pi^0 \to\gamma\gamma~.$	

== Speculative or hypothetical diagrams ==
Name or phenomenon	Description	Diagram
Flavor-changing neutral current (FCNC)	Hypothetical interactions that change the flavor of a fermion without altering its electric charge, that could happen in the standard model or beyond.	
Quad cancellations	One of the many cancellations to the quadratic divergence to squared mass of the Higgs boson which occurs in the MSSM.	
Neutrino-less double beta decay	If neutrinos are Majorana fermions (that is, their own antiparticle), Neutrino-less double beta decay is possible. Several experiments are searching for this.	
