= Oskar Anderson =

Russian-German statistician (1887–1960)

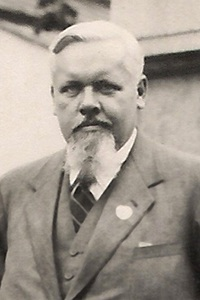
- Anderson c. 1930
- Born: Oskar Johann Viktor Anderson; 2 August [O.S. 21 July] 1887; Minsk, Russian Empire
- Died: February 12, 1960 (aged 72); Munich, Bavaria, West Germany
- Citizenship: Russia; Bulgaria; Germany
- Education: Peter the Great St. Petersburg Polytechnic University; Saint Petersburg State University
- Known for: Variate Difference Method
- Spouse: Margarethe Natalie von Hindenburg-Hirtenberg
- Scientific career
- Fields: Mathematical statistics; Econometrics
- Workplaces: University of Economics Varna; Sofia University; London School of Economics; Cornell University; Kiel University; Ludwig-Maximilians-Universität München
- Thesis: (1912)
- Academic advisors: Alexander Alexandrovich Chuprov

Oskar Johann Viktor Anderson (Russian: Оскар Николаевич Андерсон, romanized: Oskar Nikolayevich Anderson; 2 August [O.S. 21 July] 1887 – 12 February 1960) was a Russian-German mathematician of Baltic German descent. He is best known for his work on mathematical statistics and econometrics.

== Life ==
Anderson was born into Baltic German family in Minsk in the Russian Empire (present-day Belarus), but soon moved to Kazan. His father, Nikolai Anderson, was professor in Finno-Ugric languages at the University of Kazan. His older brothers were the folklorist Walter Anderson and the astrophysicist Wilhelm Anderson.

Oskar Anderson graduated from Kazan Gymnasium with a gold medal in 1906. After studying mathematics for one year at Kazan Federal University, he moved to St. Petersburg to study economics at Peter the Great St. Petersburg Polytechnic University. From 1907 to 1915, he was Aleksandr Chuprov's student and assistant. In 1912, he married Margarethe Natalie von Hindenburg-Hirtenberg, a granddaughter of Wilhelm Paul von Hindenburg-Hirtenberg, who was commemorated in "The Funeral of 'The Universal Man'" in Fyodor Dostoyevsky's A Writer's Diary, and started lecturing at a commercial school in St. Petersburg while also studying for a law degree at Saint Petersburg State University, graduating in 1914.

In 1918, he took on a professorship in Kiev but he was forced to flee Russia in 1920 due to the Russian Revolution, first taking a post in Budapest, Hungary, before becoming a professor at the University of Economics Varna in Bulgaria, in 1924.

Anderson was one of the charter members of the Econometric Society, whose members also elected him to be a fellow of the society in 1933. In the same year, he also received a fellowship from the Rockefeller Foundation.

Supported by the foundation, in 1935 he established and became director of the Statistical Institute for Economic Research at Sofia University. For the remainder of the decade, he also served the League of Nations as an associate member of its Committee of Statistical Experts.

In 1942, he joined the Kiel Institute for the World Economy as the head of the Department of Eastern Studies and also took up a full professorship of statistics at Kiel University, where he was joined by his brother Walter after the end of the Second World War. In 1947, he took a position at the Ludwig-Maximilians-Universität München, teaching there until 1956, when he retired.

== Writings ==
- Einführung in die Mathematische Statistik, Vienna: Springer-Verlag, 1935, ISBN 978-3-7091-5873-9
- Über die repräsentative Methode und deren Anwendung auf die Aufarbeitung der Ergebnisse der bulgarischen landwirtschaftlichen Betriebszählung vom 31. Dezember 1926, Munich: Bayer. Statist. Landesamt, 1949
- Die Saisonschwankungen in der deutschen Stromproduktion vor und nach dem Kriege, Munich: Inst. f. Wirtschaftsforschung, 1950
