= Salvatore Rampone =

Italian scientist and bodybuilder (born 1962)

Salvatore Rampone (born 1 May 1962 in Benevento) is an Italian scientist and bodybuilder. Professor of Computer Science at the University of Sannio - Italy, he possesses two Master of Arts degrees, in Computer Science and Informatics. Prior to becoming an academic, Rampone carried out research and teaching activity in several institutions (ALCATEL 89-90, IIASS 90-91, C.N.R. 91-93, University of Salerno 94-95, Master in Advanced Technologies of the Information and Communication 95-97), maintaining a tightened collaboration with the Cybernetics research group founded by Eduardo Caianiello at the Department of Theoretical Physics of the University of Salerno.

His research interests focus in the area of Soft Computing, but applied in several fields (Botany, Manufacturing, Telecommunication, Bioinformatics, Computer music, Cosmology, Didactics, Cyclostratigraphy, Information Theory, Signal Processing and bodybuilding). The relation between the evolutionary chain culminating in Homo sapiens and the estimated size of our universe (discovered in 1999 by him and the physicist Antonio Feoli) resolved a long debate in the Anthropic principle. The HS3D dataset of Homo Sapiens DNA regions (2001) is used to assess the prediction accuracy of methods for gene identification and characterization.

As active supporter of transhumanism, an international intellectual and cultural movement supporting the use of science and technology to improve human mental and physical characteristics and capacities, in 2004 he began an intense applied research program as competition bodybuilder. In 2005 he won the Over 40 WPF Italian Bodybuilding Championship.
