= Wick's theorem =

Theorem for reducing high-order derivatives

Wick's theorem is a method of reducing high-order derivatives to a combinatorics problem. It is named after Italian physicist Gian Carlo Wick. It is used extensively in quantum field theory to reduce arbitrary products of creation and annihilation operators to sums of products of pairs of these operators. This allows for the use of Green's function methods, and consequently the use of Feynman diagrams in the field under study. A more general idea in probability theory is Isserlis' theorem.

In perturbative quantum field theory, Wick's theorem is used to quickly rewrite each time ordered summand in the Dyson series as a sum of normal ordered terms. In the limit of asymptotically free ingoing and outgoing states, these terms correspond to Feynman diagrams.

== Definition of contraction ==
For two operators $\hat{A}$ and $\hat{B}$ we define their contraction to be

$$\hat{A}^\bullet\, \hat{B}^\bullet \equiv \hat{A}\,\hat{B}\, - \mathopen{:} \hat{A}\,\hat{B} \mathclose{:}$$

where $\mathopen{:} \hat{O} \mathclose{:}$ denotes the normal order of an operator $\hat{O}$. Alternatively, contractions can be denoted by a line joining $\hat{A}$ and $\hat{B}$, like $\overset{\sqcap}{\hat{A}\hat{B}}$.

We shall look in detail at four special cases where $\hat{A}$ and $\hat{B}$ are equal to creation and annihilation operators. For $N$ bosonic or fermionic modes we'll denote the creation operators by $\hat{a}_i^\dagger$ and the annihilation operators by $\hat{a}_i$ $(i=1,2,3,\ldots,N)$. They satisfy the commutation relations for bosonic operators $[\hat{a}_i,\hat{a}_j^\dagger]=\delta_{ij} \hat{\mathbf 1}$, or the anti-commutation relations for fermionic operators $\{\hat{a}_i,\hat{a}_j^\dagger\}=\delta_{ij} \hat{\mathbf 1}$ where $\delta_{ij}$ denotes the Kronecker delta and $\hat{ \mathbf{1}}$ denotes the identity operator.

We then have

$$\hat{a}_i^\bullet \,\hat{a}_j^\bullet = \hat{a}_i \,\hat{a}_j \,- \mathopen{:}\,\hat{a}_i\, \hat{a}_j\,\mathclose{:}\, = 0$$
$$\hat{a}_i^{\dagger\bullet}\, \hat{a}_j^{\dagger\bullet} = \hat{a}_i^\dagger\, \hat{a}_j^\dagger \,-\,\mathopen{:}\hat{a}_i^\dagger\,\hat{a}_j^\dagger\,\mathclose{:}\, = 0$$
$$\hat{a}_i^{\dagger\bullet}\, \hat{a}_j^\bullet = \hat{a}_i^\dagger\, \hat{a}_j \,- \mathopen{:}\,\hat{a}_i^\dagger \,\hat{a}_j\, \mathclose{:}\,= 0$$
$$\hat{a}_i^\bullet \,\hat{a}_j^{\dagger\bullet}= \hat{a}_i\, \hat{a}_j^\dagger \,- \mathopen{:}\,\hat{a}_i\,\hat{a}_j^\dagger \,\mathclose{:}\, = \delta_{ij} \hat{\mathbf 1}$$

where $i,j = 1,\ldots,N$.

These relationships hold true for bosonic operators or fermionic operators because of the way normal ordering is defined.

== Examples ==
We can use contractions and normal ordering to express any product of creation and annihilation operators as a sum of normal ordered terms. This is the basis of Wick's theorem. Before stating the theorem fully we shall look at some examples.

Suppose $\hat{a}_i$ and $\hat{a}_i^\dagger$ are bosonic operators satisfying the commutation relations:

$$\left [\hat{a}_i^\dagger, \hat{a}_j^\dagger \right] = 0$$
$$\left [\hat{a}_i, \hat{a}_j \right] = 0$$
$$\left [\hat{a}_i, \hat{a}_j^\dagger \right ] = \delta_{ij} \hat{\mathbf 1}$$

where $i,j = 1,\ldots,N$, $\left[ \hat{A}, \hat{B} \right] \equiv \hat{A} \hat{B} - \hat{B} \hat{A}$ denotes the commutator, and $\delta_{ij}$ is the Kronecker delta.

We can use these relations, and the above definition of contraction, to express products of $\hat{a}_i$ and $\hat{a}_i^\dagger$ in other ways.

=== Example 1 ===
$$\hat{a}_i \,\hat{a}_j^\dagger = \hat{a}_j^\dagger \,\hat{a}_i + \delta_{ij} = \hat{a}_j^\dagger \,\hat{a}_i + \hat{a}_i^\bullet \,\hat{a}_j^{\dagger\bullet} =\,\mathopen{:}\,\hat{a}_i\, \hat{a}_j^\dagger \,\mathclose{:}  + \hat{a}_i^\bullet \,\hat{a}_j^{\dagger\bullet}$$

Note that we have not changed $\hat{a}_i \,\hat{a}_j^\dagger$ but merely re-expressed it in another form as $\,\mathopen{:}\,\hat{a}_i\, \hat{a}_j^\dagger \,\mathclose{:} + \hat{a}_i^\bullet \,\hat{a}_j^{\dagger\bullet}$

=== Example 2 ===
$$\hat{a}_i \,\hat{a}_j^\dagger \, \hat{a}_k= (\hat{a}_j^\dagger \,\hat{a}_i + \delta_{ij})\hat{a}_k = \hat{a}_j^\dagger \,\hat{a}_i\, \hat{a}_k + \delta_{ij}\hat{a}_k = \hat{a}_j^\dagger \,\hat{a}_i\,\hat{a}_k + \hat{a}_i^\bullet \,\hat{a}_j^{\dagger\bullet} \hat{a}_k =\,\mathopen{:}\,\hat{a}_i\, \hat{a}_j^\dagger \hat{a}_k \,\mathclose{:}  + \mathclose{:} \,\hat{a}_i^\bullet \,\hat{a}_j^{\dagger\bullet} \,\hat{a}_k \mathclose{:}$$

=== Example 3 ===
$\hat{a}_i \,\hat{a}_j^\dagger \, \hat{a}_k \,\hat{a}_l^\dagger= (\hat{a}_j^\dagger \,\hat{a}_i + \delta_{ij})(\hat{a}_l^\dagger\,\hat{a}_k + \delta_{kl})$

$$= \hat{a}_j^\dagger \,\hat{a}_i\, \hat{a}_l^\dagger\, \hat{a}_k + \delta_{kl}\hat{a}_j^\dagger \,\hat{a}_i  + \delta_{ij}\hat{a}_l^\dagger\hat{a}_k + \delta_{ij} \delta_{kl}$$
$$=  \hat{a}_j^\dagger (\hat{a}_l^\dagger\, \hat{a}_i + \delta_{il}) \hat{a}_k + \delta_{kl}\hat{a}_j^\dagger \,\hat{a}_i  + \delta_{ij}\hat{a}_l^\dagger\hat{a}_k + \delta_{ij} \delta_{kl}$$
$$= \hat{a}_j^\dagger \hat{a}_l^\dagger\, \hat{a}_i \hat{a}_k + \delta_{il} \hat{a}_j^\dagger \, \hat{a}_k + \delta_{kl}\hat{a}_j^\dagger \,\hat{a}_i  + \delta_{ij}\hat{a}_l^\dagger\hat{a}_k + \delta_{ij} \delta_{kl}$$
$$= \,\mathopen{:}\hat{a}_i \,\hat{a}_j^\dagger \, \hat{a}_k \,\hat{a}_l^\dagger\,\mathclose{:} + \mathopen{:}\,\hat{a}_i^\bullet \,\hat{a}_j^\dagger \, \hat{a}_k \,\hat{a}_l^{\dagger\bullet}\,\mathclose{:}+\mathopen{:}\,\hat{a}_i \,\hat{a}_j^\dagger \, \hat{a}_k^\bullet \,\hat{a}_l^{\dagger\bullet}\,\mathclose{:}+\mathopen{:}\,\hat{a}_i^\bullet \,\hat{a}_j^{\dagger\bullet} \, \hat{a}_k \,\hat{a}_l^\dagger\,\mathclose{:}+  \,\mathopen{:}\hat{a}_i^\bullet \,\hat{a}_j^{\dagger\bullet} \, \hat{a}_k^{\bullet\bullet}\,\hat{a}_l^{\dagger\bullet\bullet} \mathclose{:}$$

In the last line we have used different numbers of $^\bullet$ symbols to denote different contractions. By repeatedly applying the commutation relations it takes a lot of work to express $\hat{a}_i \,\hat{a}_j^\dagger \, \hat{a}_k \,\hat{a}_l^\dagger$ in the form of a sum of normally ordered products. It is an even lengthier calculation for more complicated products.

Luckily Wick's theorem provides a shortcut.

== Statement of the theorem ==
A product of creation and annihilation operators $\hat{A} \hat{B} \hat{C} \hat{D} \hat{E} \hat{F}\ldots$ can be expressed as

$$\begin{align}
\hat{A} \hat{B} \hat{C} \hat{D} \hat{E} \hat{F}\ldots &= \mathopen{:} \hat{A} \hat{B} \hat{C} \hat{D} \hat{E} \hat{F}\ldots \mathclose{:} \\
&\quad + \sum_\text{singles} \mathopen{:} \hat{A}^\bullet \hat{B}^\bullet \hat{C} \hat{D} \hat{E} \hat{F} \ldots \mathclose{:} \\
&\quad + \sum_\text{doubles} \mathopen{:} \hat{A}^\bullet \hat{B}^{\bullet\bullet} \hat{C}^{\bullet\bullet} \hat{D}^\bullet \hat{E} \hat{F} \ldots \mathclose{:} \\
&\quad + \ldots
\end{align},$$

where $^\bullet$ and $^{\bullet\bullet}$ denote different contraction pairs: $\hat{A}$ is contracted with $\hat{D}$, $\hat{B}$ is contracted with $\hat{C}$.

In other words, a string of creation and annihilation operators can be rewritten as the normal-ordered product of the string, plus the normal-ordered product after all single contractions among operator pairs, plus all double contractions, etc., plus all full contractions.

Applying the theorem to the above examples provides a much quicker method to arrive at the final expressions.

A warning: In terms on the right hand side containing multiple contractions, care must be taken when the operators are fermionic. In this case an appropriate minus sign must be introduced according to the following rule: rearrange the operators (introducing minus signs whenever the order of two fermionic operators is swapped) to ensure the contracted terms are adjacent in the string. The contraction can then be applied (See "Rule C" in Wick's paper).

Example:

If we have two fermions ($N=2$) with creation and annihilation operators $\hat{f}_i^\dagger$ and $\hat{f}_i$ ($i=1,2$) then

$$\begin{align}
\hat{f}_1 \,\hat{f}_2 \, \hat{f}_1^\dagger \,\hat{f}_2^\dagger \,= {} & \,\mathopen{:} \hat{f}_1 \,\hat{f}_2 \, \hat{f}_1^\dagger \,\hat{f}_2^\dagger \, \mathclose{:} \\[5pt]
& - \,\hat{f}_1^\bullet \, \hat{f}_1^{\dagger\bullet} \, \,\mathopen{:} \hat{f}_2 \, \hat{f}_2^\dagger \, \mathclose{:} + \,\hat{f}_1^\bullet \, \hat{f}_2^{\dagger\bullet} \, \,\mathopen{:} \hat{f}_2 \, \hat{f}_1^\dagger \, \mathclose{:} +\, \hat{f}_2^\bullet \, \hat{f}_1^{\dagger\bullet} \, \,\mathopen{:} \hat{f}_1 \,\hat{f}_2^\dagger \, \mathclose{:} - \hat{f}_2^\bullet \,\hat{f}_2^{\dagger\bullet} \, \,\mathopen{:} \hat{f}_1 \, \hat{f}_1^\dagger \, \mathclose{:} \\[5pt]
& -\hat{f}_1^{\bullet\bullet} \, \hat{f}_1^{\dagger\bullet\bullet} \, \hat{f}_2^\bullet \, \hat{f}_2^{\dagger\bullet} \, + \hat{f}_1^{\bullet\bullet} \,\hat{f}_2^{\dagger\bullet\bullet}\, \hat{f}_2^\bullet \, \hat{f}_1^{\dagger\bullet} \, \end{align}$$

Note that the term with contractions of the two creation operators and of the two annihilation operators is not included because their contractions vanish.

== Proof ==
Induction is used to prove the theorem for bosonic creation and annihilation operators. The $N=2$ base case is trivial, because there is only one possible contraction:

$$\hat{A}\hat{B} = \mathopen{:}\hat{A}\hat{B}\mathclose{:} + (\hat{A}\,\hat{B}\, - \mathopen{:} \hat{A}\,\hat{B} \mathclose{:}) = \mathopen{:}\hat{A}\hat{B}\mathclose{:} + \hat{A}^\bullet\hat{B}^\bullet$$

In general, the only non-zero contractions are between an annihilation operator on the left and a creation operator on the right. Suppose that Wick's theorem is true for $N-1$ operators $\hat{B} \hat{C} \hat{D} \hat{E} \hat{F}\ldots$, and consider the effect of adding an Nth operator $\hat{A}$ to the left of $\hat{B} \hat{C} \hat{D} \hat{E} \hat{F}\ldots$ to form $\hat{A}\hat{B}\hat{C}\hat{D}\hat{E} \hat{F}\ldots$. By Wick's theorem applied to $N-1$ operators, we have:

$$\begin{align}
\hat{A} \hat{B} \hat{C} \hat{D} \hat{E} \hat{F}\ldots &=  \hat{A} \mathopen{:}\hat{B} \hat{C} \hat{D} \hat{E} \hat{F}\ldots \mathclose{:} \\
&\quad + \hat{A} \sum_\text{singles} \mathopen{:}  \hat{B}^\bullet \hat{C}^\bullet \hat{D} \hat{E} \hat{F} \ldots \mathclose{:} \\
&\quad + \hat{A} \sum_\text{doubles} \mathopen{:} \hat{B}^\bullet \hat{C}^{\bullet\bullet} \hat{D}^{\bullet\bullet} \hat{E}^\bullet \hat{F} \ldots \mathclose{:} \\
&\quad + \hat{A} \ldots
\end{align}$$

$\hat{A}$ is either a creation operator or an annihilation operator. If $\hat{A}$ is a creation operator, all above products, such as $\hat{A}\mathopen{:}\hat{B} \hat{C} \hat{D} \hat{E} \hat{F}\ldots \mathclose{:}$, are already normal ordered and require no further manipulation. Because $\hat{A}$ is to the left of all annihilation operators in $\hat{A}\hat{B}\hat{C}\hat{D}\hat{E}\hat{F}\ldots$, any contraction involving it will be zero. Thus, we can add all contractions involving $\hat{A}$ to the sums without changing their value. Therefore, if $\hat{A}$ is a creation operator, Wick's theorem holds for $\hat{A}\hat{B}\hat{C}\hat{D}\hat{E}\hat{F}\ldots$.

Now, suppose that $\hat {A}$ is an annihilation operator. To move $\hat {A}$ from the left-hand side to the right-hand side of all the products, we repeatedly swap $\hat{A}$ with the operator immediately right of it (call it $\hat{X}$), each time applying $\hat{A}\hat{X} = \mathopen{:}\hat{A}\hat{X}\mathclose{:} + \hat{A}^\bullet\hat{X}^\bullet$ to account for noncommutativity. Once we do this, all terms will be normal ordered. All terms added to the sums by pushing $\hat{A}$ through the products correspond to additional contractions involving $\hat{A}$. Therefore, if $\hat{A}$ is an annihilation operator, Wick's theorem holds for $\hat{A}\hat{B}\hat{C}\hat{D}\hat{E}\hat{F}\ldots$.

We have proved the base case and the induction step, so the theorem is true. By introducing the appropriate minus signs, the proof can be extended to fermionic creation and annihilation operators. The theorem applied to fields is proved in essentially the same way.

== Wick's theorem applied to fields ==
The correlation function that appears in quantum field theory can be expressed by a contraction on the field operators:

$$\mathcal C(x_1, x_2)=\left \langle 0 \mid \mathcal T\phi_i(x_1)\phi_i(x_2)\mid 0\right \rangle= \langle 0 \mid \overline{\phi_i(x_1)\phi_i(x_2)}\mid 0 \rangle=i\Delta_F(x_1-x_2)
=i\int{\frac{d^4k}{(2\pi)^4}\frac{e^{-ik(x_1-x_2)}}{(k^2-m^2)+i\epsilon}},$$

where the operator $\overline{\phi_i(x_1)\phi_i(x_2)}$ is the component that does not annihilate the vacuum state $|0\rangle$. Which means that $\overline{AB}=\mathcal TAB-\mathopen{:}\mathcal TAB\mathclose{:}$. This means that $\overline{AB}$ is a contraction over $\mathcal TAB$. Note that the contraction of a time-ordered string of two field operators is a C-number.

In the end, we arrive at Wick's theorem:

The T-product of a time-ordered free fields string can be expressed in the following manner:

$$\mathcal T\prod_{k=1}^m\phi(x_k)=\mathopen{:}\mathcal T\prod\phi_i(x_k)\mathclose{:}+\sum_{\alpha,\beta}\overline{\phi(x_\alpha)\phi(x_\beta)}\mathopen{:}\mathcal T\prod_{k\not=\alpha,\beta}\phi_i(x_k)\mathclose{:}+{}$$

$$\mathcal
{}+\sum_{(\alpha,\beta),(\gamma,\delta)}\overline{\phi(x_\alpha)\phi(x_\beta)}\;\overline{\phi(x_\gamma)\phi(x_\delta)}\mathopen{:}\mathcal T\prod_{k\not=\alpha,\beta,\gamma,\delta}\phi_i(x_k)\mathclose{:}+\cdots.$$

Applying this theorem to S-matrix elements, we discover that normal-ordered terms acting on vacuum state give a null contribution to the sum. We conclude that m is even and only completely contracted terms remain.

$$F_m^i(x)=\left \langle 0 \mid \mathcal T\phi_i(x_1)\phi_i(x_2)\mid 0\right \rangle=\sum_\mathrm{pairs}\overline{\phi(x_1)\phi(x_2)}\cdots
\overline{\phi(x_{m-1})\phi(x_m})$$

$$G_p^{(n)}=\left \langle 0 \mid \mathcal T\mathopen{:}v_i(y_1)\mathclose{:}\dots\mathopen{:}v_i(y_n)\mathclose{:}\phi_i(x_1)\cdots \phi_i(x_p)\mid0\right \rangle$$

where p is the number of interaction fields (or, equivalently, the number of interacting particles) and n is the development order (or the number of vertices of interaction). For example, if $v=gy^4 \Rightarrow \mathopen{:}v_i(y_1)\mathclose{:}=\mathopen{:}\phi_i(y_1)\phi_i(y_1)\phi_i(y_1)\phi_i(y_1)\mathclose{:}$

This is analogous to the corresponding Isserlis' theorem in statistics for the moments of a Gaussian distribution.

Note that this discussion is in terms of the usual definition of normal ordering which is appropriate for the vacuum expectation values (VEV's) of fields. (Wick's theorem provides as a way of expressing VEV's of n fields in terms of VEV's of two fields.) There are any other possible definitions of normal ordering, and Wick's theorem is valid irrespective. However Wick's theorem only simplifies computations if the definition of normal ordering used is changed to match the type of expectation value wanted. That is we always want the expectation value of the normal ordered product to be zero. For instance in thermal field theory a different type of expectation value, a thermal trace over the density matrix, requires a different definition of normal ordering.

== See also ==
- Isserlis' theorem
