= Alexander Ivanovich Chuprov =

Russian political economist and statistician

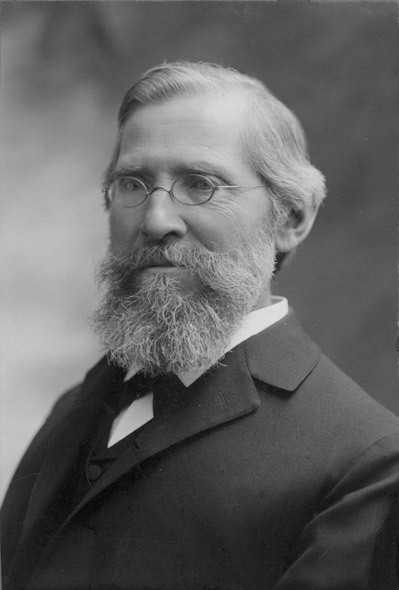

Alexander Ivanovich Chuprov (Александр Иванович Чупров; 1841–1908) was a professor of political economy and statistics at Moscow University whose lectures provided the standard introduction to economics for late 19th-century Russian students.

Chuprov's father was an Orthodox priest based in Mosalsk. Alexander attended the Law Department of the Moscow University where he became interested in Wilhelm Roscher's research. He founded the Moscow Society to Disseminate Technical Knowledge in 1869 and was elected into the Russian Academy of Sciences in 1887.

Chuprov has been described as the founder of transport economics and the multiple-factor analysis of economic regions. In his landmark work The Railway Economy (1875–78) he analyzed statistics on railway traffic. He distinguished one region from another according to "the value of the market, the cost of transportation, and demographic indicators".

Chuprov became known as "the heart and soul" of zemstvo statistical investigations and sample surveys in the Russian Empire. His researchers are said to have interviewed 4.5 million Russian muzhiks. Their mission was to provide a modern statistical description of the Russian peasant commune, or obschina. Chuprov viewed the Russian obshchina as a valuable social institution which should be preserved.

Chuprov was a lifelong friend of another prominent statistician, Ivan Yanzhul. One of his students at the Moscow University was Wassily Kandinsky. His son Alexander A. Chuprov (1874–1926) is said to have given "much impetus to statistics in pre-revolutionary Russia".
