= Leon Isserlis =

Russian-born British statistician

- Born: June 1881; Bohuslav, Russian Empire (present-day Ukraine)
- Died: 14 March 1966 (aged 85)
- Citizenship: British
- Education: University of Cambridge, University College London
- Known for: Isserlis’ theorem
- Awards: Guy Medal (Silver, 1939)
- Scientific career
- Fields: Statistician
- Workplaces: West Ham Technical Institute, Chamber of Shipping
- Doctoral advisor: Karl Pearson

Leon Isserlis (1881–1966) was a Russian-born British statistician known for his work on the exact distribution of sample moments, including Isserlis’ theorem. He also brought to the attention of British statisticians the work of Russian mathematicians and statisticians, including Chebyshev and Chuprov.

He was born in Bohuslav near Kyiv in June 1881 and was a direct descendant of the eminent rabbi Moses Isserles. He moved to Britain when he was ten years old with his widowed mother, an elder brother and two sisters. He attended the City of London School and won an open scholarship to study mathematics at Christ's College, Cambridge. Upon leaving Cambridge in 1904 he was appointed head of mathematics at the West Ham Municipal Technical Institute (one of the forerunners of the University of East London). He also registered as a research student at University College London, where he studied under Karl Pearson, and was awarded a D.Sc. in 1916. In March 1920 he moved to become statistician to the Chamber of Shipping and remained there until his retirement in 1942, when his position as statistician was taken by Maurice Kendall.

In 1926 he wrote a review for the Journal of the Royal Statistical Society of R. A. Fisher's seminal book Statistical Methods for Research Workers. The review was rather critical, particularly of Fisher's lack of references to earlier work by others such as Chebyshev.

He was a friend of Major Greenwood and worked with him on statistical issues for the Medical Research Council, although most of this work was anonymous and unpublished. He was also chairman of the Jewish Health Organization from 1931 to 1939. He served as secretary of the Royal Statistical Society in 1934–35 and again in 1944–45, and was awarded its Guy Medal in Silver in 1939.
