= Ivan Yanzhul =

Russian financial law expert and statistician

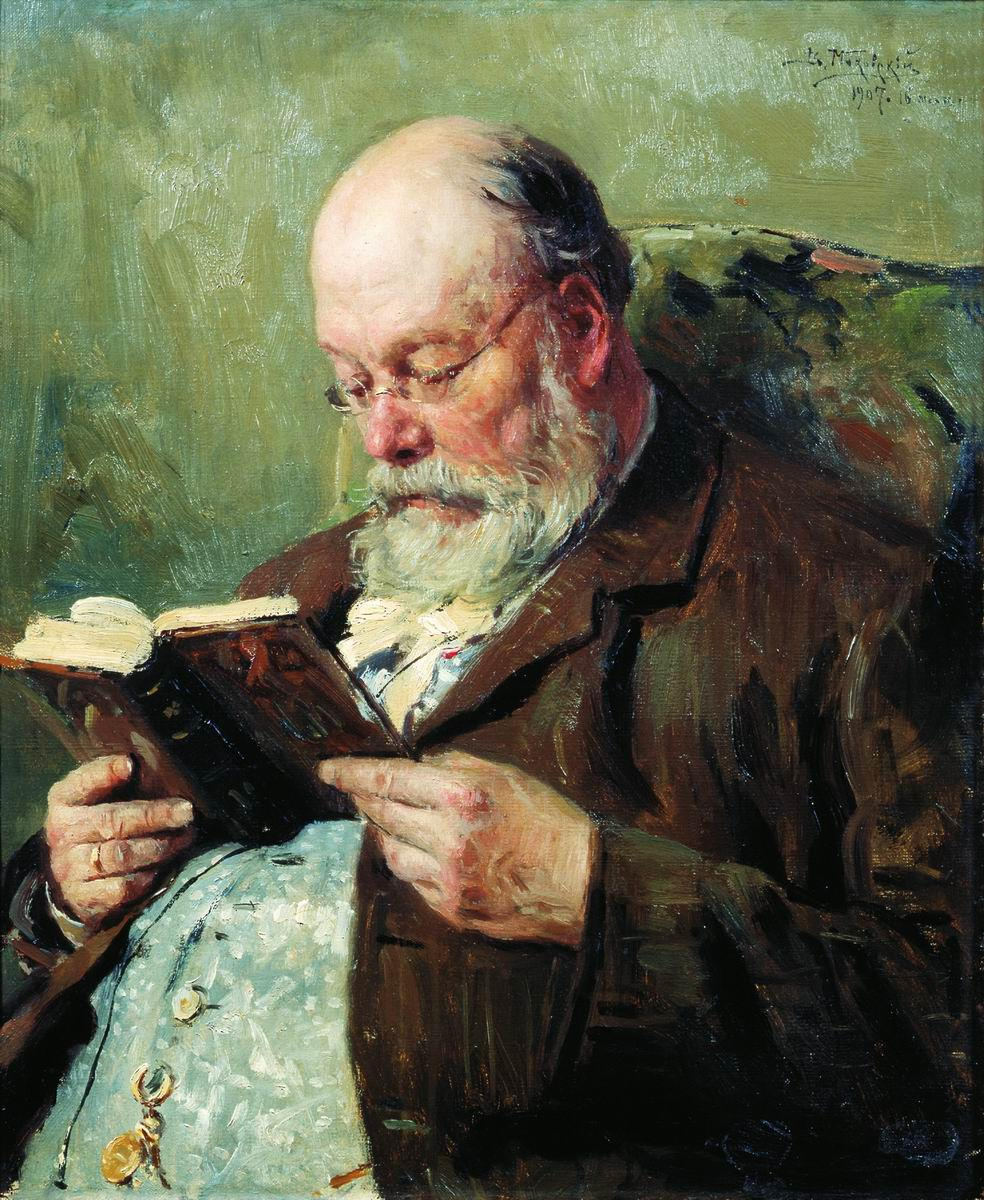
A portrait by Vladimir Makovsky

Ivan Ivanovich Yanzhul (Russian: Иван Иванович Янжул; 14 June [O.S. 2 June] 1846 – 31 October [O.S. 18 October] 1914) was a professor of financial law at Moscow University who established the Russian state factory inspection. He helped enforce the first Russian labour code (1 June 1882) which provided a measure of protection for Russian factory workers. His job involved finding an industrial enterprise, gaining access to the premises and forcing the owner to halt illegal practices such as night child labor. His political views have been described as state socialism in that he advocated that government manipulation of tax and customs policy was sufficient for the realisation of socialism. Yanzhul was elected into the Russian Academy of Sciences in 1895. His memoirs were published in 2 volumes in 1910 and 1911.
