= Isserlis's theorem =

Theorem in probability theory

In probability theory, Isserlis's theorem or Wick's probability theorem is a formula that allows one to compute higher-order moments of the multivariate normal distribution in terms of its covariance matrix. It is named after Leon Isserlis.

This theorem is also particularly important in particle physics, where it is known as Wick's theorem after the work of Wick (1950). Other applications include the analysis of portfolio returns, quantum field theory and generation of colored noise.

== Statement ==
If $(X_1,\dots, X_{n})$ is a zero-mean multivariate normal random vector, then
$$\operatorname{E} [\,X_1 X_2\cdots X_{n}\,] = \sum_{p\in P_n^2}\prod_{\{i,j\}\in p} \operatorname{E}[\,X_i X_j\,] = \sum_{p\in P_n^2}\prod_{\{i,j\}\in p}  \operatorname{Cov}(\,X_i, X_j\,),$$
where the sum is over all the pairings of $\{1,\ldots,n\}$, i.e. all distinct ways of partitioning $\{1,\ldots,n\}$ into pairs $\{i,j\}$, and the product is over the pairs contained in $p$.

More generally, if $(Z_1,\dots, Z_{n})$ is a zero-mean complex-valued multivariate normal random vector, then the formula still holds.

The expression on the right-hand side is also known as the hafnian of the covariance matrix of $(X_1,\dots, X_{n})$.

=== Odd case ===
If $n=2m+1$ is odd, there does not exist any pairing of $\{1,\ldots,2m+1\}$. Under this hypothesis, Isserlis's theorem implies that
$$\operatorname{E}[\,X_1 X_2\cdots X_{2m+1}\,] = 0.$$
This also follows from the fact that $-X=(-X_1,\dots,-X_n)$ has the same distribution as $X$, which implies that $\operatorname{E}[\,X_1 \cdots X_{2m+1}\,]=\operatorname{E}[\,(-X_1) \cdots (-X_{2m+1})\,]=-\operatorname{E}[\,X_1 \cdots X_{2m+1}\,] = 0$.

=== Even case ===
In his original paper, Leon Isserlis proves this theorem by mathematical induction, generalizing the formula for the $4^{\text{th}}$ order moments, which takes the appearance

$$\operatorname{E}[\,X_1 X_2 X_3 X_4\,] =
\operatorname{E}[X_1X_2]\,\operatorname{E}[X_3X_4] +
\operatorname{E}[X_1X_3]\,\operatorname{E}[X_2X_4] +
\operatorname{E}[X_1X_4]\,\operatorname{E}[X_2X_3].$$

If $n=2m$ is even, there exist $(2m)!/(2^{m}m!) = (2m-1)!!$ (see double factorial) pair partitions of $\{1,\ldots,2m\}$: this yields $(2m)!/(2^{m}m!) = (2m-1)!!$ terms in the sum. For example, for $4^{\text{th}}$ order moments (i.e. $4$ random variables) there are three terms. For $6^{\text{th}}$-order moments there are $3\times 5=15$ terms, and for $8^{\text{th}}$-order moments there are $3\times5\times7 = 105$ terms.

=== Example ===
We can evaluate the characteristic function of gaussians by the Isserlis theorem:
$$E[e^{-iX}] = \sum_k \frac{(-i)^k}{k!} E[X^k] = \sum_k \frac{(-i)^{2k}}{(2k)!} E[X^{2k}] = \sum_k \frac{(-i)^{2k}}{(2k)!} \frac{(2k)!}{k!2^k} E[X^{2}]^k = e^{-\frac 12 E[X^2]}$$

== Proof ==
Since both sides of the formula are multilinear in $X_1, ..., X_n$, if we can prove the real case, we get the complex case for free.

Let $\Sigma_{ij} = \operatorname{Cov}(X_i, X_j)$ be the covariance matrix, so that we have the zero-mean multivariate normal random vector $(X_1, ..., X_n) \sim N(0, \Sigma)$. Since both sides of the formula are continuous with respect to $\Sigma$, it suffices to prove the case when $\Sigma$ is invertible. In particular, this means that if some of $X_1, \dots, X_n$ are identical, such as in $E[X_1^3 X_2]$, then it reduces to the case where all variables are linearly independent, as in $E[X_1 X_2 X_3 X_4]$.

Using quadratic factorization $-x^T\Sigma^{-1}x/2 + v^Tx - v^T\Sigma v/2 = -(x-\Sigma v)^T\Sigma^{-1}(x-\Sigma v)/2$, we get

$$\frac{1}{\sqrt{(2\pi)^n\det\Sigma}}\int e^{-x^T\Sigma^{-1}x/2 + v^Tx} dx = e^{v^T\Sigma v/2}$$

Differentiate under the integral sign with $\partial_{v_1, ..., v_n}|_{v_1, ..., v_n=0}$ to obtain
$$E[X_1\cdots X_n] = \partial_{v_1, ..., v_n}\Big|_{v_1, ..., v_n=0}e^{v^T\Sigma v/2}$$
That is, we need only find the coefficient of term $v_1\cdots v_n$ in the Taylor expansion of
$$e^{v^T\Sigma v/2} = \sum_m \frac{1}{2^m m!} (v^T\Sigma v)^m$$
Since the quantity is even in $v$, if $n$ is odd, this is zero. So let $n = 2m$, then we need only find the coefficient of term $v_1 v_2\cdots v_{2m-1} v_{2m}$ in the polynomial $\frac{1}{2^m m!} \left(\sum_{ij}v_iv_j \Sigma_{ij}\right)^m$.

Combinatorially, each pairing $\pi$ of $1, 2, \dots, 2m-1, 2m$ corresponds to a way to obtain $v_1 v_2\cdots v_{2m-1} v_{2m}$, by picking one $v_i v_j \Sigma_{ij}$ from each bracket for each $(i, j) \in \pi$. There are $2^m m!$ ways to pick in this way, cancelling out the $\frac{1}{2^m m!}$ term. $\square$

== Generalizations ==
=== Gaussian integration by parts ===
An equivalent formulation of the Wick's probability formula is the Gaussian integration by parts. If $(X_1,\dots X_{n})$ is a zero-mean multivariate normal random vector, then

$$\operatorname{E}(X_1 f(X_1,\ldots,X_n))=\sum_{i=1}^{n} \operatorname{Cov}(X_1, X_i)\operatorname{E}(\partial_{X_i}f(X_1,\ldots,X_n)).$$
This is a generalization of Stein's lemma.

The Wick's probability formula can be recovered by induction, considering the function $f:\mathbb{R}^n\to\mathbb{R}$ defined by $f(x_1,\ldots,x_n)=x_2\ldots x_n$. Among other things, this formulation is important in Liouville conformal field theory to obtain conformal Ward identities, BPZ equations and to prove the Fyodorov-Bouchaud formula.

=== Non-Gaussian random variables ===
For non-Gaussian random variables, the moment-cumulants formula replaces the Wick's probability formula. If $(X_1,\dots X_{n})$ is a vector of random variables, then
$$\operatorname{E}(X_1 \ldots X_n)=\sum_{p\in P_n} \prod_{b\in p} \kappa\big((X_i)_{i\in b}\big),$$
where the sum is over all the partitions of $\{1,\ldots,n\}$, the product is over the blocks of $p$ and $\kappa\big((X_i)_{i\in b}\big)$ is the joint cumulant of $(X_i)_{i\in b}$.

=== Uniform distribution on the unit sphere ===
Consider $X = (X_1,\dots,X_d)$ uniformly distributed on the unit sphere $S^{d-1}$, so that $\|X\|=1$ almost surely. In this setting, the following holds.

If $n$ is odd,
$$\operatorname{E}\bigl[X_{i_1}\,X_{i_2}\,\cdots\,X_{i_n}\bigr] \;=\; 0.\!$$

If $n = 2k$ is even,
$$\operatorname{E}\bigl[X_{i_1}\,\cdots\,X_{i_{2k}}\bigr]
\;=\;
\frac{1}{d\,\bigl(d+2\bigr)\bigl(d+4\bigr)\cdots\bigl(d + 2k - 2\bigr)}
\sum_{p \in P_{2k}^2}
\prod_{\{r,s\}\in p} \delta_{\,i_r,i_s},$$
where $P_{2k}^2$ is the set of all pairings of $\{1,\ldots,2k\}$, $\delta_{i,j}$ is the Kronecker delta.

Since there are $|P_{2k}^2|=(2k - 1)!!$ delta-terms, we get on the diagonal:
$$\operatorname{E}[\,X_1^{2k}\,]
\;=\;
\frac{(2k - 1)!!}{d\,\bigl(d+2\bigr)\bigl(d+4\bigr)\cdots\bigl(d + 2k - 2\bigr)}.$$
Here, $(2k - 1)!!$ denotes the double factorial.

These results are discussed in the context of random vectors and irreducible representations in the work by Kushkuley (2021).

== See also ==
- Wick's theorem
- Cumulants
- Normal distribution
