= Eduardo R. Caianiello =

Italian physicist

- Born: June 25, 1921; Naples
- Died: October 22, 1993 (aged 72); Naples
- Education: University of Rochester
- Scientific career
- Fields: Theoretical physics
- Doctoral advisor: Robert Marshak
- Notable students: Francesco Guerra Maria Marinaro

Eduardo Renato Caianiello (June 25, 1921 – October 22, 1993) was an Italian physicist. He contributed to scientific research, especially in quantum theory and cybernetics. He was also a pioneer in the theory of neural networks. His Caianiello's equation formalized the theory of Hebbian learning.

Caianello founded and directed the Institute of Theoretical Physics of the University of Naples; the Laboratory of Cybernetics of the Consiglio Nazionale delle Ricerche at Arco Felice (Naples), the Faculty of Mathematical, Physical and Natural Sciences of the University of Salerno, the International Institute for Senior Scientific Studies (IIASS) at Vietri sul Mare (Salerno) and the School of Specialization in Cyber and Physical Sciences.

The name of the Hafnian was coined by Caianiello "to mark the fruitful period of stay in Copenhagen (Hafnia in Latin)."
