= Alexander Alexandrovich Chuprov =

Russian mathematician (1874–1926)

Alexander Alexandrovich Chuprov or Tschuprov (Russian: Алекса́ндр Алекса́ндрович Чупро́в; February 18, 1874 – April 19, 1926) was a Russian statistician who worked on mathematical statistics, sample survey theory and demography.

== Early life and career ==
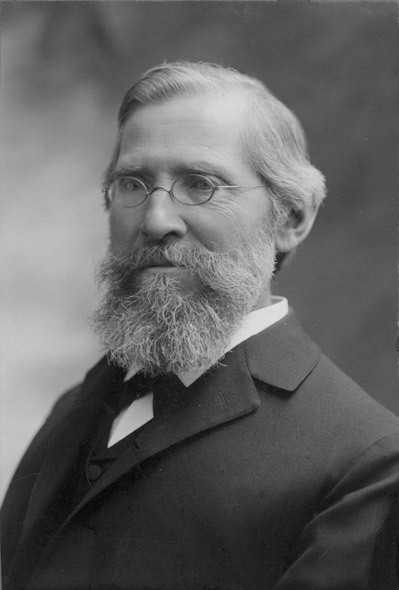
Alexander Ivanovich Chuprov (father)

Chuprov was born in Mosalsk but grew up and was educated in Moscow where his father, Alexander Ivanovich (1842–1908), a distinguished economist and statistician, was a professor. Alexander Alexandrovich graduated from the physico-mathematical faculty of Moscow University in 1896 with a dissertation on "The theory of probability as the foundation of theoretical statistics." He spent the years 1897–1901 studying political economy in Germany, in Berlin and Strasbourg. His doctoral dissertation, supervised by Georg Friedrich Knapp (1842–1926) Die Feldgemeinschaft, eine morphologische Untersuchung was published in 1902. The most important result of his stay in Germany was his friendship with the statistician Ladislaus Bortkiewicz. On his return to Russia and, in order to get a teaching position, Chuprov completed master's examinations at the University of Moscow, concentrating on theoretical economics and the application of mathematical methods. He started teaching at the St. Petersburg Polytechnical Institute and was in charge of the teaching of statistics until 1917.

Chuprov used to go abroad regularly to work in foreign libraries. In June 1917, he went to Stockholm to the Statistical Bureau. He was away from Russia when the Bolshevik Revolution occurred. He intended to return but first illness and then money problems prevented him. In January 1919, he became director of the statistical bureau of the Central Union in Stockholm and in charge of its publication Bulletin of World Economy. In the middle of 1920, he moved to Dresden where in complete seclusion he wrote furiously. In 1925, he took up an appointment with the Russian College in Prague. The following year he died.

== Work and influence ==
Chuprov was influential both as a teacher and as a writer. The curriculum he designed for the St. Petersburg Polytechnic Institute was modern and his book on the theory of statistics was influential. He had some good students, the best known was Oskar Anderson. Chuprov's research was influenced by Bortkiewicz on the theoretical side and his father, A. I. Chuprov, on the empirical. Bortkiewicz was the leading exponent of the dispersion theory of Lexis and Chuprov contributed to this research. (There is a brief account of the history of this theory in Heyde & Seneta (1977.)) A. I. Chuprov was the leader of a movement to get statistical information on social conditions in Russia. By 1910, his son A. A. Chuprov was writing about the use of random sampling in such investigations. His work paralleled that of Bowley in England. Chuprov's first work on sampling was not mathematical but in the 1920s he developed the formula for optimal allocation in stratified sampling (to be rediscovered by Neyman in 1934 and usually associated with him). Chuprov also did demographic research.

Chuprov tried to bring together the approaches of Bortkiewicz and Lexis, of the Russian mathematicians and of the English biometricians. He watched developments in Britain and was sympathetic to the work of Karl Pearson, much more so than A. A. Markov with whom he corresponded on statistical matters. Both Chuprov and his student Oskar Anderson published in Pearson's journal Biometrika. Chuprov was not above telling the English off, "English scientific tradition rejects the concept of 'mathematical probability' ... and the method of mathematical expectation has naturally shared the fate of the concept ... on which it rests." For a brief period Chuprov was known in Britain. In John Maynard Keynes' Treatise on Probability (1921) he is put with Markov and Chebyshev as the three great Russian names in the theory of statistics. However, with the rise of Fisherian statistics, Chuprov was forgotten. In Scandinavia he had a more lasting influence, principally through the papers he published in the Skandinavisk Aktuarietidskrift.

== Publications ==
Until recently (see Sheynin link below) only a few of Chuprov's many works were available in English

- Al. A. Tchouproff (1918) On the Mathematical Expectation of the Moments of Frequency Distributions, Biometrika, 12, No. 1/2, pp. 140–169.
- A. A. Chuprov (1924) On the Mathematical Expectation of the Moments of Frequency Distributions in the Case of Correlated Observations, Metron, 2, 461–493, 646–683.
- A. A. Tschuprow Principles of the Mathematical Theory of Correlation; translated by M. Kantorowitsch. W. Hodge & Co. 1939
- The Correspondence between A.A. Markov and A.A. Chuprov on the Theory of Probability and Mathematical Statistics, ed. Kh.O. Ondar (1981, Springer)

== Obituaries ==
- L. I. (Leon Isserlis) (1926) Alexander Alexandrovitch Tschuprow, Journal of the Royal Statistical Society, Vol. 89, No. 3 (May, 1926), pp. 619–622.
- J. M. K. (John Maynard Keynes) (1926) Obituary: Professor A. A. Tschuprow, Economic Journal, Vol. 36, No. 143 (Sep., 1926), pp. 517–518.

== Discussion ==
- E. Seneta (2001) Aleksander Aleksandrovich Chuprov, Statisticians of the Centuries (ed. C. C. Heyde and E. Seneta) pp. 303–307. New York: Springer.
- E. Seneta "Chuprov, Alexander Alexandrovich," pp. 185–7 in Leading Personalities in Statistical Sciences from the Seventeenth Century to the Present, (ed. N. L. Johnson and S. Kotz) 1997. New York: Wiley. Originally published in Encyclopedia of Statistical Science.
- O Sheynin, Aleksandr A Chuprov : life, work, correspondence. The making of mathematical statistics (Göttingen, 1996).
- E. Seneta (1985) A Sketch of the History of Survey Sampling in Russia, Journal of the Royal Statistical Society, 148, 118–125.
- C. C. Heyde & E. Seneta (1977) I. J. Bienaymé: Statistical Theory Anticipated, New York: Springer.
