= List of scattering experiments =

This is a list of scattering experiments.

== Specific experiments of historical significance ==
- Davisson–Germer experiment
- Gold foil experiments, performed by Geiger and Marsden for Rutherford which discovered the atomic nucleus
- Elucidation of the structure of DNA by X-ray crystallography
- Discovery of the antiproton at the Bevatron
- Discovery of W and Z bosons at CERN
- Discovery of the Higgs boson at the Large Hadron Collider
- MINERνA

== Types of experiment ==
=== Optical methods ===
- Compton scattering
- Raman scattering
- X-ray crystallography
- Biological small-angle scattering with X-rays, or Small-angle X-ray scattering
- Static light scattering
- Dynamic light scattering
- Polymer scattering with X-rays

=== Neutron-based methods ===
- Neutron scattering
- Biological small-angle scattering with neutrons, or Small-angle neutron scattering
- Polymer scattering with neutrons

=== Particle accelerators ===
- Electrostatic nuclear accelerator
- Linear induction accelerator
- Betatron
- Linear particle accelerator
- Cyclotron
- Synchrotron
