= James Arnold Crowther =

British physicist (1883–1950)

James Arnold Crowther (28 August 1883 – 25 March 1950) was a British physicist who worked on beta particle scattering with J. J. Thomson in connection with the first tests of modern atomic physics (see plum pudding model), as well as X-ray scattering, including practical applications in medical radiology. He authored numerous textbooks and was a founding Fellow of the Institute of Physics.

== Education and career ==
Born in Sheffield, Yorkshire, England, on 28 August 1883, Crowther attended the University of Cambridge from 1903 to 1906.

In 1906, as the Hutchison Student of St. John's and Open Research Student of Emmanuel, he published "On the coefficient of absorption of the β rays from uranium" based on work he did under the direction of Thomson. In this work Crowther measured the intensity of radiation from uranium as it passed through various material like mica, cardboard, and especially a series of metal foils. He continued this work for several years with increasingly sophisticated apparatus. Among the important contributions of this work was the introduction of highly collimated beams of radiation and very thin films of metal, enabling a shift from measuring simple absorption values to measuring particle intensity by scattering angle. Ernest Rutherford, together with Hans Geiger and his student Ernest Marsden, applied these ideas and others to the scattering of alpha particles from metal foils to discover that the atom has a compact nucleus of charge.

Crowther continued this work as Mackinnon Student of the Royal Society and then as Fellow of St. John's through 1924. During this time he wrote "The life and discoveries of Michael Faraday".

During World War I, Crowther collaborated with Alfred Robb to run one of the first diagnostic X-ray labs, at Addenbrooke's Hospital in Cambridge. Later, Crowther became the editor of the Handbook of Industrial Radiology, a lecturer (1921–1924) in medical radiology at Cambridge and President of the British Institute of Radiology.

From 1924 to 1946, Crowther was chair of the physics department at University of Reading. During this time, he wrote his popular and influential book Ions, Electrons and Ionising Radiations. Also during this period, he helped to found the Institute of Physics.

== Personal life ==
Crowther died on 25 March 1950, leaving a widow and two sons.
