= Rutherford scattering experiments =

Experiments proving existence of atomic nuclei

A replica of an apparatus used by Geiger and Marsden to measure alpha particle scattering in a 1913 experiment

The Rutherford scattering experiments were a landmark series of experiments by which scientists learned that every atom has a nucleus where all of its positive charge and most of its mass is concentrated. They deduced this after measuring how an alpha particle beam is scattered when it strikes a thin metal foil. The experiments were performed between 1906 and 1913 by Hans Geiger and Ernest Marsden under the direction of Ernest Rutherford at the Physical Laboratories of the University of Manchester.

The physical phenomenon was explained by Rutherford in a classic 1911 paper that eventually led to the widespread use of scattering in particle physics to study subatomic matter. Rutherford scattering or Coulomb scattering is the elastic scattering of charged particles by the Coulomb interaction. The paper also initiated the development of the planetary Rutherford model of the atom and eventually the Bohr model.

== Summary ==
=== Thomson's model of the atom ===
The "plum pudding model" of an atom with seven electrons, as imagined by J. J. Thomson in 1905

The prevailing model of atomic structure before Rutherford's experiments was devised by J. J. Thomson. Thomson had discovered the electron through his work on cathode rays and proposed that they existed within atoms, and an electric current is electrons hopping from one atom to an adjacent one in a series. There logically had to be a commensurate amount of positive charge to balance the negative charge of the electrons and hold those electrons together. Having no idea what the source of this positive charge was, he tentatively proposed that the positive charge was everywhere in the atom, adopting a spherical shape for simplicity. Thomson imagined that the balance of electrostatic forces would distribute the electrons throughout this sphere in a more or less even manner. Thomson also believed the electrons could move around in this sphere, and in that regard, he likened the substance of the sphere to a liquid. The positive sphere was more of an abstraction than anything material. He did not propose a positively-charged subatomic particle; a counterpart to the electron.

Thomson was never able to develop a complete and stable model that could predict any of the other known properties of the atom, such as emission spectra and valencies. The Japanese scientist Hantaro Nagaoka rejected Thomson's model on the grounds that opposing charges cannot penetrate each other. He proposed instead that electrons orbit the positive charge like the rings around Saturn. However, this model was also known to be unstable.

=== Alpha particles and the Thomson atom ===
An alpha particle is a positively charged particle of matter that is spontaneously emitted from certain radioactive elements. Alpha particles are so tiny as to be invisible, but they can be detected with the use of phosphorescent screens, photographic plates, or electrodes. Rutherford discovered them in 1899. In 1906, by studying how alpha particle beams are deflected by magnetic and electric fields, he deduced that they were essentially helium atoms stripped of two electrons. Thomson and Rutherford knew nothing about the internal structure of alpha particles. At the time, scientists did not know exactly how many electrons a helium atom had (nor atoms of other elements for that matter), so a helium atom stripped of two electrons might still have ten or so left for all they could tell.

Thomson's model was consistent with the experimental evidence available at the time. Thomson studied beta particle scattering, which showed small-angle deflections modelled as interactions of the particle with many atoms in succession. Each interaction of the particle with the electrons of the atom and the positive background sphere would lead to a tiny deflection, but many such collisions could add up. The scattering of alpha particles was expected to be similar. Rutherford's team would show that the multiple scattering model was not needed: single scattering from a compact charge at the centre of the atom would account for all of the scattering data.

=== Rutherford, Geiger, and Marsden ===
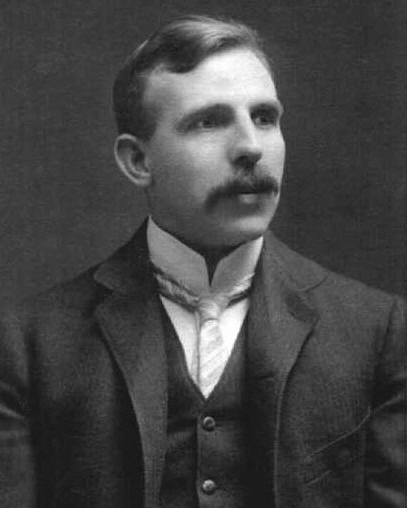
Ernest Rutherford

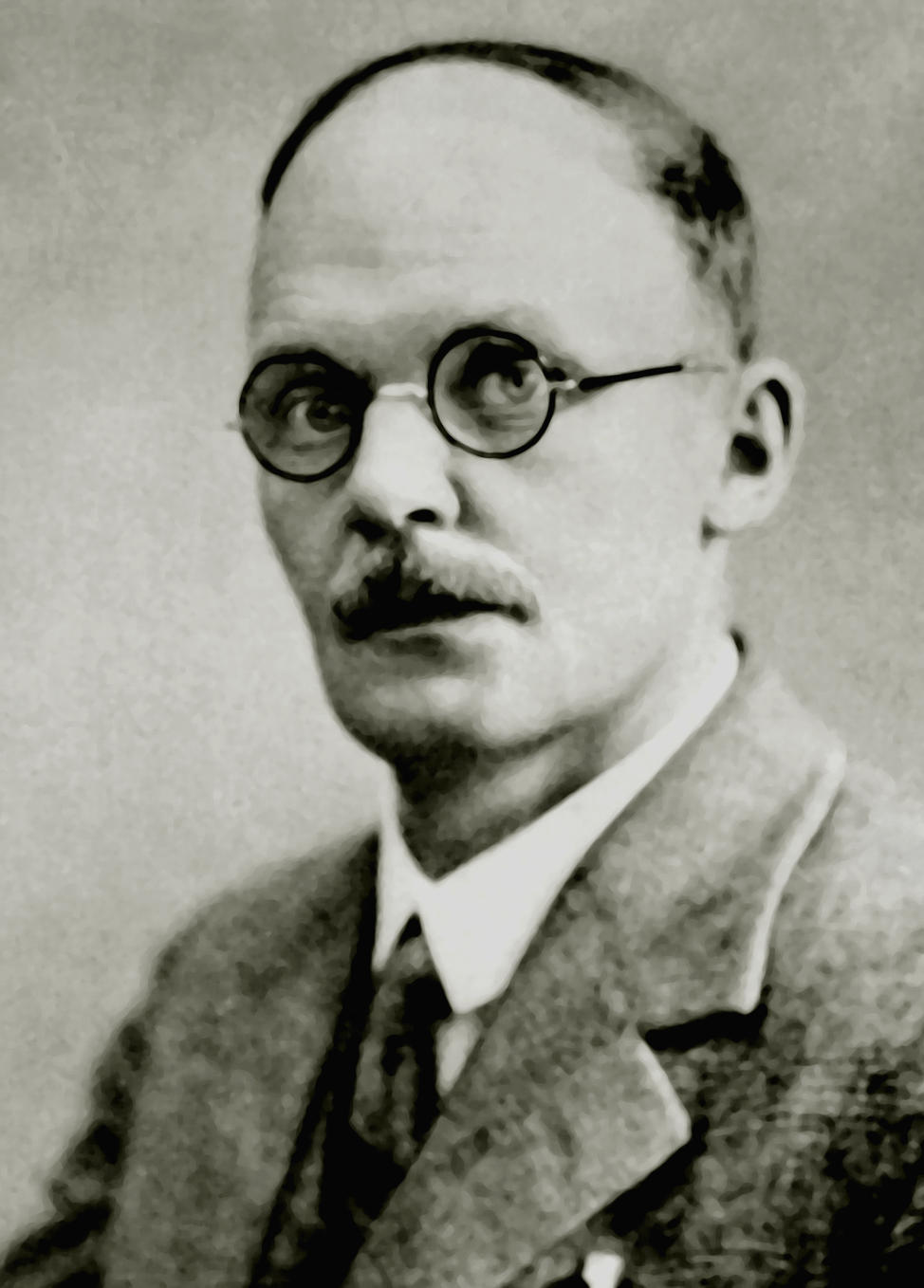
Hans Geiger

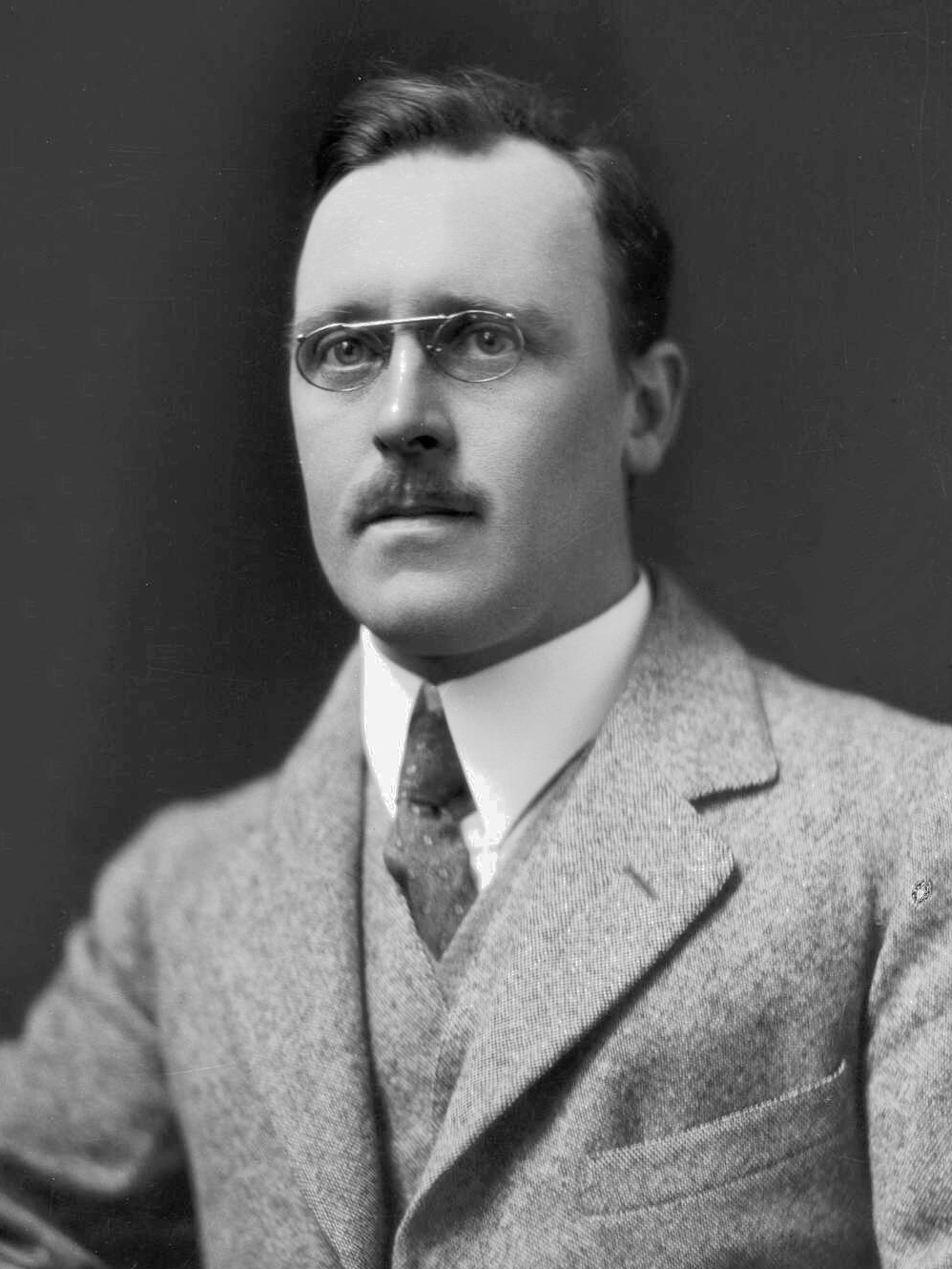
Ernest Marsden

Ernest Rutherford was Langworthy Professor of Physics at the Victoria University of Manchester (now the University of Manchester). He had already received numerous honours for his studies of radiation. He had discovered the existence of alpha rays, beta rays, and gamma rays, and had proved that these were the consequence of the disintegration of atoms. In 1906, he received a visit from the German physicist Hans Geiger, and was so impressed that he asked Geiger to stay and help him with his research. Ernest Marsden was a physics undergraduate student studying under Geiger.

In 1908, Rutherford sought to determine the charge and mass of alpha particles independently. To do this, he wanted to count the number of alpha particles and measure their total charge; the ratio would give the charge of a single alpha particle. Alpha particles are too tiny to see, but Rutherford knew about the Townsend discharge, a cascade effect from ionisation leading to a pulse of electric current. On this principle, Rutherford and Geiger designed a simple counting device which consisted of two electrodes in a glass tube containing low pressure gas. (See #1908 experiment.) Every alpha particle that passed through the gas would create a pulse of electrical current that could be detected and counted. It was the forerunner of the Geiger-Müller Counter.

The counter that Geiger and Rutherford built proved unreliable because the alpha particles were being too strongly deflected by their collisions with the molecules of air within the detection chamber. The highly variable trajectories of the alpha particles meant that they did not all generate the same number of ions as they passed through the gas, thus producing erratic readings. This puzzled Rutherford because he had thought that alpha particles were too heavy to be deflected so strongly. Rutherford asked Geiger to investigate how far matter could scatter alpha rays.

The experiments they designed involved bombarding metal foil with a beam of alpha particles to observe how the foil scattered them in relation to its thickness and material. They used a phosphorescent screen to measure the trajectories of the particles. Each impact of an alpha particle on the screen produced a tiny flash of light. Geiger worked in a darkened lab for hours on end, counting these tiny scintillations using a microscope. For the metal foil, they tested a variety of metals, but favoured gold because they could make the foil very thin, as gold is the most malleable metal. As a source of alpha particles, Rutherford's substance of choice was radium, which is thousands of times more radioactive than uranium.

=== Scattering theory and the new atomic model ===
Left: Had Thomson's model been correct, all the alpha particles should have passed through the foil with minimal scattering. Right: What Geiger and Marsden observed was that a small fraction of the alpha particles experienced strong deflection.

In a 1909 experiment, Geiger and Marsden discovered that the metal foils could scatter some alpha particles in all directions, sometimes more than 90°. This should have been impossible according to Thomson's model. According to Thomson's model, all the alpha particles should have gone straight through.

In Thomson's model of the atom, the sphere of positive charge that fills the atom and encapsulates the electrons is permeable; the electrons could move around in it, after all. Therefore, an alpha particle should be able to pass through this sphere if the electrostatic forces within permit it. Thomson himself did not study how an alpha particle might be scattered in such a collision with an atom, but he did study beta particle scattering. He calculated that a beta particle would only experience very small deflection when passing through an atom, and even after passing through many atoms in a row, the total deflection should still be less than 1°. Alpha particles typically have much more momentum than beta particles and therefore should likewise experience only the slightest deflection.

The extreme scattering observed forced Rutherford to revise the model of the atom. The issue in Thomson's model was that the charges were too diffuse to produce a sufficiently strong electrostatic force to cause such repulsion. Therefore they had to be more concentrated. In Rutherford's new model, the positive charge does not fill the entire volume of the atom but instead constitutes a tiny nucleus at least 10,000 times smaller than the atom as a whole. All that positive charge concentrated in a much smaller volume produces a much stronger electric field near its surface. The nucleus also carried most of the atom's mass. This meant that it could deflect alpha particles by up to 180° depending on how close they pass. The electrons surround this nucleus, spread throughout the atom's volume. Because their negative charge is diffuse and their combined mass is low, they have a negligible effect on the alpha particle.

To verify his model, Rutherford developed a scientific model to predict the intensity of alpha particles at the different angles they scattered coming out of the gold foil, assuming all of the positive charge was concentrated at the centre of the atom. This model was validated in an experiment performed in 1913. His model explained both the beta scattering results of Thomson and the alpha scattering results of Geiger and Marsden.

=== Legacy ===
There was little reaction to Rutherford's now-famous 1911 paper in the first years. The paper was primarily about alpha particle scattering in an era before particle scattering was a primary tool for physics. The probability techniques he used and confusing collection of observations involved were not immediately compelling.

==== Nuclear physics ====
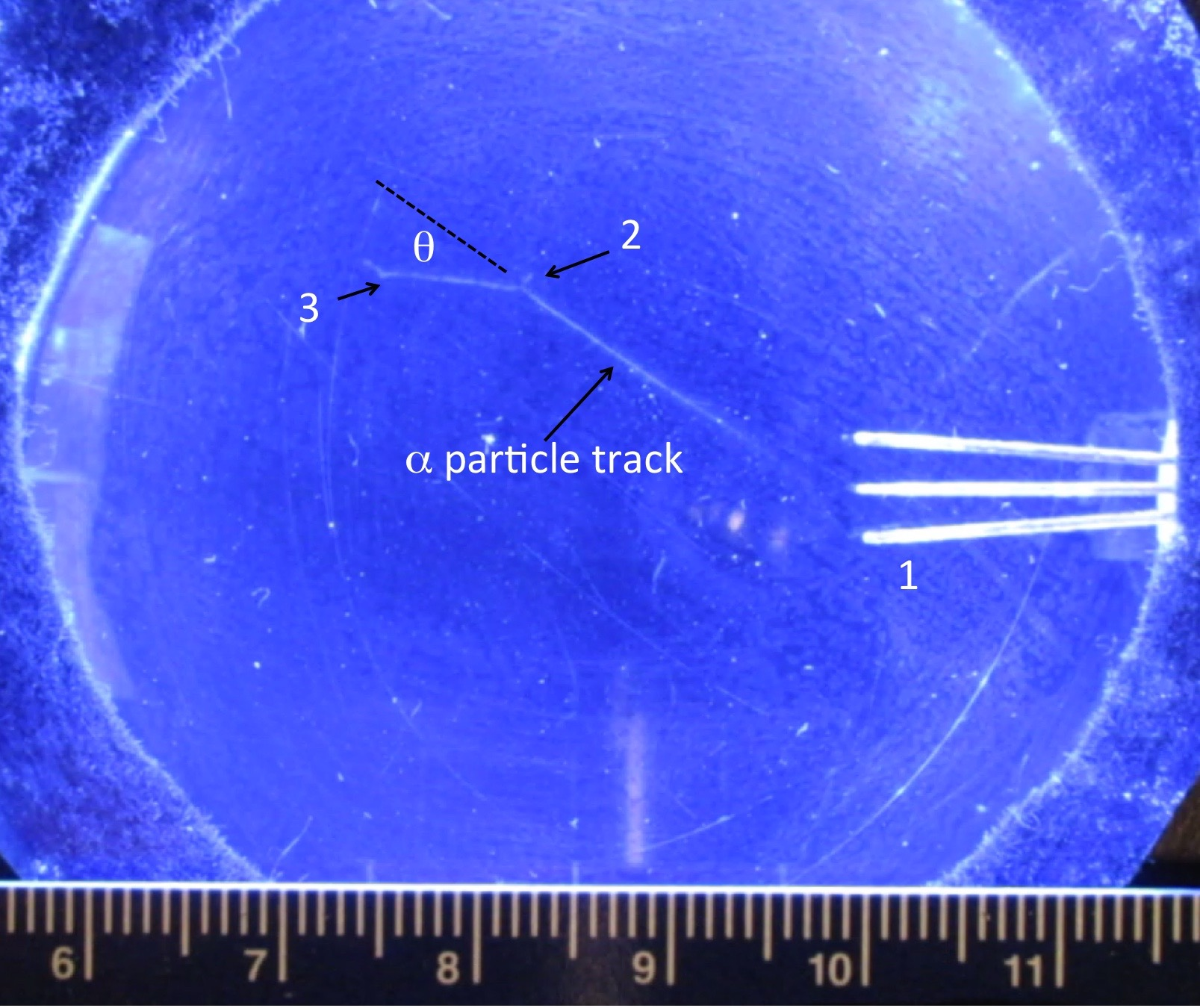
In a cloud chamber, a 5.3 MeV alpha particle track from a ^{210}Pb source (1) undergoes Rutherford scattering (2), deflecting by an angle of about 30°. It scatters once again (3), and finally comes to rest in the gas. The target nucleus recoils, leaving a short track (2). (cm scale)

The first impacts were to encourage new focus on scattering experiments. For example the first results from a cloud chamber, by C.T.R. Wilson shows alpha particle scattering and also appeared in 1911. Over time, particle scattering became a major aspect of theoretical and experimental physics; Rutherford's concept of a "cross section" now dominates the descriptions of experimental particle physics. The historian Silvan S. Schweber suggests that Rutherford's approach marked the shift to viewing all interactions and measurements in physics as scattering processes. After the nucleus - a term Rutherford introduced in 1912 - became the accepted model for the core of atoms, Rutherford's analysis of the scattering of alpha particles created a new branch of physics, nuclear physics.

==== Atomic model ====
Rutherford's new atom model caused no stir. Rutherford explicitly ignores the electrons, only mentioning Hantaro Nagaoka's Saturnian model of electrons orbiting a tiny "sun", a model that had been previously rejected as mechanically unstable. By ignoring the electrons Rutherford also ignores any potential implications for atomic spectroscopy for chemistry. Rutherford himself did not press the case for his atomic model: his own 1913 book on "Radioactive substances and their radiations" only mentions the atom twice; other books by other authors around this time focus on Thomson's model.

The impact of Rutherford's nuclear model came after Niels Bohr arrived as a post-doctoral student in Manchester at Rutherford's invitation. Bohr dropped his work on the Thomson model in favour of Rutherford's nuclear model, developing the Rutherford–Bohr model over the next several years. Eventually Bohr incorporated early ideas of quantum mechanics into the model of the atom, allowing prediction of electronic spectra and concepts of chemistry.

Hantaro Nagaoka, who had proposed a Saturnian model of the atom, wrote to Rutherford from Tokyo in 1911: "I have been struck with the simpleness of the apparatus you employ and the brilliant results you obtain." The astronomer Arthur Eddington called Rutherford's discovery the most important scientific achievement since Democritus proposed the atom ages earlier. Rutherford has since been hailed as "the father of nuclear physics".

In a lecture delivered on 15 October 1936 at Cambridge University, Rutherford described his shock at the results of the 1909 experiment:

Then I remember two or three days later Geiger coming to me in great excitement and saying, "We have been able to get some of the α-particles coming backwards...". It was quite the most incredible event that has ever happened to me in my life. It was almost as incredible as if you fired a 15-inch shell at a piece of tissue paper and it came back and hit you. On consideration, I realised that this scattering backward must be the result of a single collision, and when I made calculations I saw that it was impossible to get anything of that order of magnitude unless you took a system in which the greater part of the mass of the atom was concentrated in a minute nucleus. It was then that I had the idea of an atom with a minute massive centre, carrying a charge.

Rutherford's claim of surprise makes for a good story but by the time of the Geiger-Marsden experiment, the result confirmed suspicions Rutherford developed from previous experiments.

== Experiments ==
=== Alpha particle scattering: 1906 and 1908 experiments ===
Rutherford's first steps towards his discovery of the nature of the atom came from his work to understand alpha particles. In 1906, Rutherford noticed that alpha particles passing through sheets of mica were deflected by the sheets by as much as 2 degrees. Rutherford placed a radioactive source in a sealed tube ending with a narrow slits followed by a photographic plate. Half of the slit was covered by a thin layer of mica. A magnetic field around the tube was altered every 10 minutes to reject the effect of beta rays, known to be sensitive to magnetic fields. The tube was evacuated to different amounts and a series of images recorded. At the lowest pressure the image of the open slit was clear, while images of the mica covered slit or the open slit at higher pressures were fuzzy. Rutherford explained these results as alpha-particle scattering in a paper published in 1906. He already understood the implications of the observation for models of atoms: "such a result brings out clearly the fact that the atoms of matter must be the seat of very intense electrical forces".

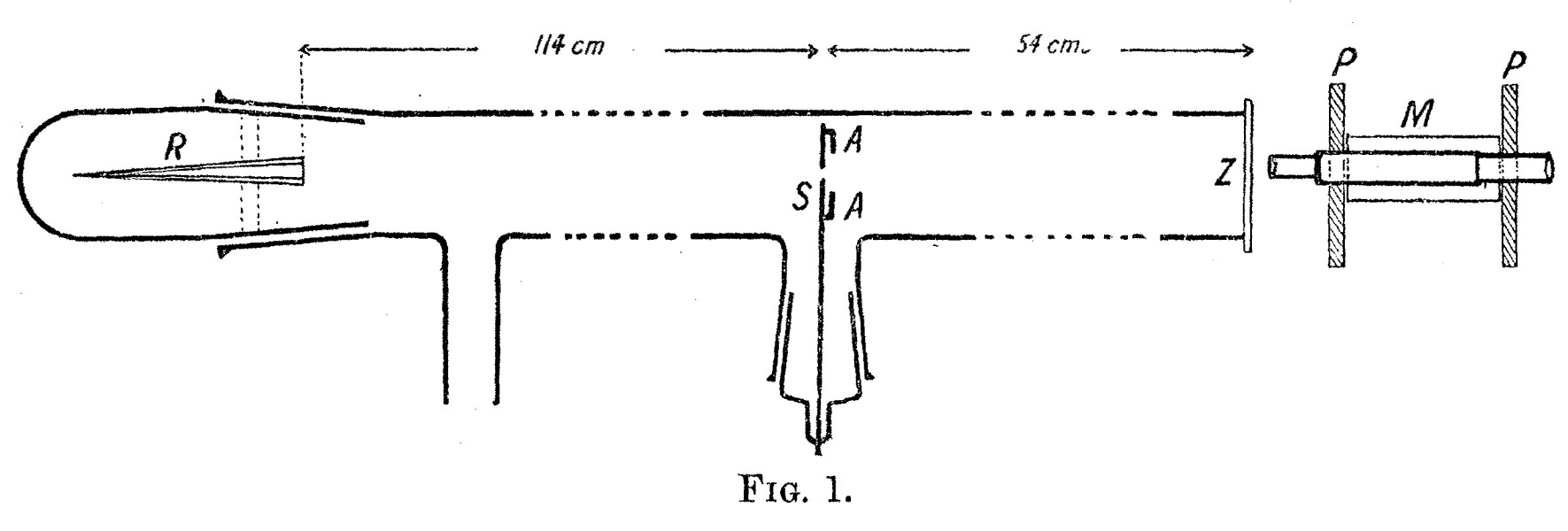
This apparatus was described in a 1908 paper by Hans Geiger. It could only measure deflections of a few degrees.

A 1908 paper by Geiger, On the Scattering of α-Particles by Matter, describes the following experiment. He constructed a long glass tube, nearly two metres long. At one end of the tube was a quantity of "radium emanation" (R) as a source of alpha particles. The opposite end of the tube was covered with a phosphorescent screen (Z). In the middle of the tube was a 0.9 mm-wide slit. The alpha particles from R passed through the slit and created a glowing patch of light on the screen. A microscope (M) was used to count the scintillations on the screen and measure their spread. Geiger pumped all the air out of the tube so that the alpha particles would be unobstructed, and they left a neat and tight image on the screen that corresponded to the shape of the slit. Geiger then allowed some air into the tube, and the glowing patch became more diffuse. Geiger then pumped out the air and placed one or two gold foils over the slit at AA. This too caused the patch of light on the screen to become more spread out, with the larger spread for two layers. This experiment demonstrated that both air and solid matter could markedly scatter alpha particles.

=== Alpha particle reflection: the 1909 experiment ===
The results of the initial alpha particle scattering experiments were confusing. The angular spread of the particle on the screen varied greatly with the shape of the apparatus and its internal pressure. Rutherford suggested that Ernest Marsden, a physics undergraduate student studying under Geiger, should look for diffusely reflected or back-scattered alpha particles, even though these were not expected. Marsden's first crude reflector got results, so Geiger helped him create a more sophisticated apparatus. They were able to demonstrate that 1 in 8000 alpha particle collisions were diffuse reflections. Although this fraction was small, it was much larger than the Thomson model of the atom could explain.

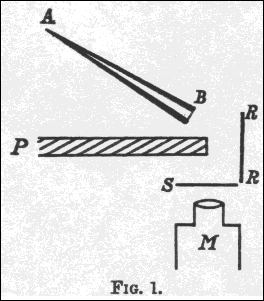
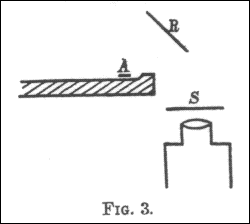
In these experiments, alpha particles emitted by a radioactive source (A) were observed bouncing off a metal reflector (R) and onto a fluorescent screen (S) on the other side of a lead plate (P).

These results were published in a 1909 paper, On a Diffuse Reflection of the α-Particles, where Geiger and Marsden described the experiment by which they proved that alpha particles can indeed be scattered by more than 90°. In their experiment, they prepared a small conical glass tube (AB) containing "radium emanation" (radon), "radium A" (actual radium), and "radium C" (bismuth-214); its open end was sealed with mica. This was their alpha particle emitter. They then set up a lead plate (P), behind which they placed a fluorescent screen (S). The tube was held on the opposite side of plate, such that the alpha particles it emitted could not directly strike the screen. They noticed a few scintillations on the screen because some alpha particles got around the plate by bouncing off air molecules. They then placed a metal foil (R) to the side of the lead plate. They tested with lead, gold, tin, aluminium, copper, silver, iron, and platinum. They pointed the tube at the foil to see if the alpha particles would bounce off it and strike the screen on the other side of the plate, and observed an increase in the number of scintillations on the screen. Counting the scintillations, they observed that metals with higher atomic mass, such as gold, reflected more alpha particles than lighter ones such as aluminium.

Geiger and Marsden then wanted to estimate the total number of alpha particles that were reflected. The previous setup was unsuitable for doing this because the tube contained several radioactive substances (radium plus its decay products) and thus the alpha particles emitted had varying ranges, and because it was difficult for them to ascertain at what rate the tube was emitting alpha particles. This time, they placed a small quantity of radium C (bismuth-214) on the lead plate, which bounced off a platinum reflector (R) and onto the screen. They concluded that approximately 1 in 8,000 of the alpha particles that struck the reflector bounced onto the screen. By measuring the reflection from thin foils they showed that the effect was due to a volume and not a surface effect. When contrasted with the vast number of alpha particles that pass unhindered through a metal foil, this small number of large angle reflections was a strange result that meant very large forces were involved.

=== Dependence on foil material and thickness: the 1910 experiment ===
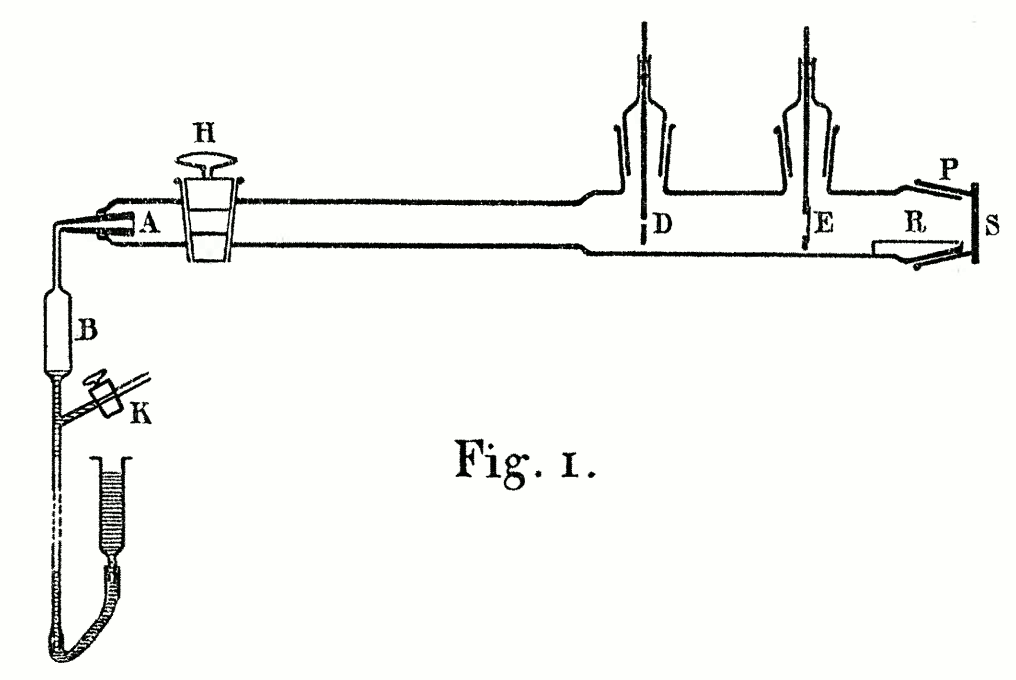
This apparatus was described in 1910 paper by Geiger. It was designed to precisely measure how the scattering varied according to the substance and thickness of the foil.

A 1910 paper by Geiger, The Scattering of the α-Particles by Matter, describes an experiment to measure how the most probable angle through which an alpha particle is deflected varies with the material it passes through, the thickness of the material, and the velocity of the alpha particles. He constructed an airtight glass tube from which the air was pumped out. At one end was a bulb (B) containing "radium emanation" (radon-222). By means of mercury, the radon in B was pumped up the narrow glass pipe whose end at A was plugged with mica. At the other end of the tube was a fluorescent zinc sulfide screen (S). The microscope which he used to count the scintillations on the screen was affixed to a vertical millimetre scale with a vernier, which allowed Geiger to precisely measure where the flashes of light appeared on the screen and thus calculate the particles' angles of deflection. The alpha particles emitted from A were narrowed to a beam by a small circular hole at D. Geiger placed a metal foil in the path of the rays at D and E to observe how the zone of flashes changed. He tested gold, tin, silver, copper, and aluminium. He could also vary the velocity of the alpha particles by placing extra sheets of mica or aluminium at A.

From the measurements he took, Geiger came to the following conclusions:

- the most probable angle of deflection increases with the thickness of the material
- the most probable angle of deflection is proportional to the atomic mass of the substance
- the most probable angle of deflection decreases with the velocity of the alpha particles

=== Rutherford's Structure of the Atom paper (1911) ===
Considering the results of these experiments, Rutherford published a landmark paper in 1911 titled "The Scattering of α and β Particles by Matter and the Structure of the Atom" wherein he showed that single scattering from a very small and intense electric charge predicts primarily small-angle scattering with small but measurable amounts of backscattering. For the purpose of his mathematical calculations he assumed this central charge was positive, but he admitted he could not prove this and that he had to wait for other experiments to develop his theory.

Rutherford developed a mathematical equation that modelled how the foil should scatter the alpha particles if all the positive charge and most of the atomic mass was concentrated in a point at the centre of an atom. From the scattering data, Rutherford estimated the central charge q_{n} to be about +100 units.

Rutherford's paper does not discuss any electron arrangement beyond discussions on the scattering from Thomson's plum pudding model and Nagaoka's Saturnian model. He shows that the scattering results predicted by Thomson's model are also explained by single scattering, but that Thomson's model does not explain large angle scattering. He says that Nagaoka's model, having a compact charge, would agree with the scattering data. But the Saturnian model had previously been rejected on other grounds. The so-called Rutherford model of the atom with orbiting electrons was not proposed by Rutherford in the 1911 paper.

=== Confirming the scattering theory: the 1913 experiment ===
In a 1913 paper, The Laws of Deflexion of α Particles through Large Angles, Geiger and Marsden describe a series of experiments by which they sought to experimentally verify Rutherford's equation. Rutherford's equation predicted that the number of scintillations per minute s that will be observed at a given angle Φ should be proportional to:

1. cosec^{4}Φ/2
2. thickness of foil t
3. magnitude of the square of central charge Q_{n}
4. 1/(mv^{2})^{2}

Their 1913 paper describes four experiments by which they proved each of these four relationships.

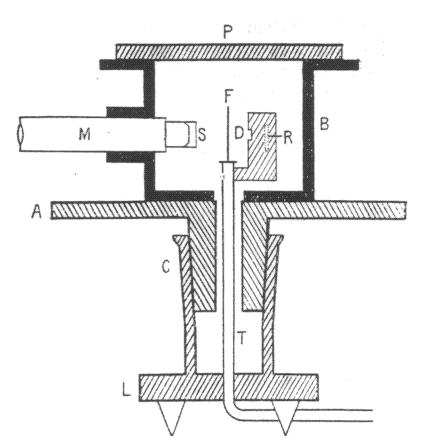
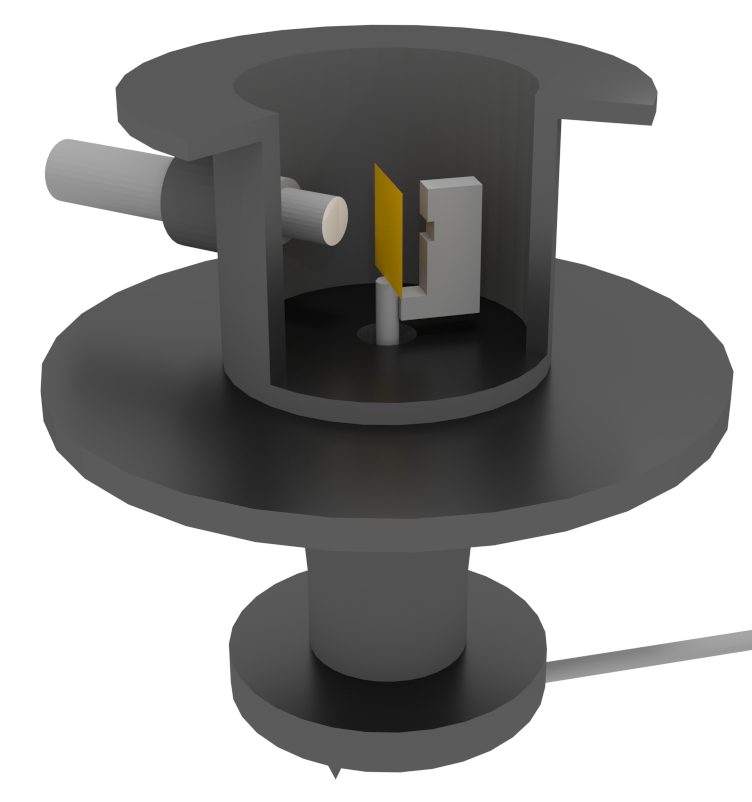
This apparatus was designed to accurately measure the scattering pattern of the alpha particles produced by the metal foil (F). The microscope (M) and screen (S) were affixed to a rotating cylinder and could be moved in a full circle around the foil.

To test how the scattering varied with the angle of deflection (i.e. if s ∝ csc^{4}Φ/2). Geiger and Marsden built an apparatus that consisted of a hollow metal cylinder mounted on a turntable. Inside the cylinder was a metal foil (F) and a radiation source containing radon (R), mounted on a detached column (T) which allowed the cylinder to rotate independently. The column was also a tube by which air was pumped out of the cylinder. A microscope (M) with its objective lens covered by a fluorescent zinc sulfide screen (S) penetrated the wall of the cylinder and pointed at the metal foil. They tested with silver and gold foils. By turning the table, the microscope could be moved a full circle around the foil, allowing Geiger to observe and count alpha particles deflected by up to 150°. Correcting for experimental error, Geiger and Marsden found that the number of alpha particles that are deflected by a given angle Φ is indeed proportional to csc^{4}Φ/2.

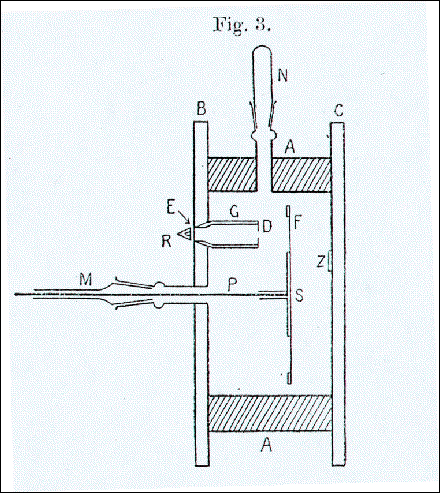
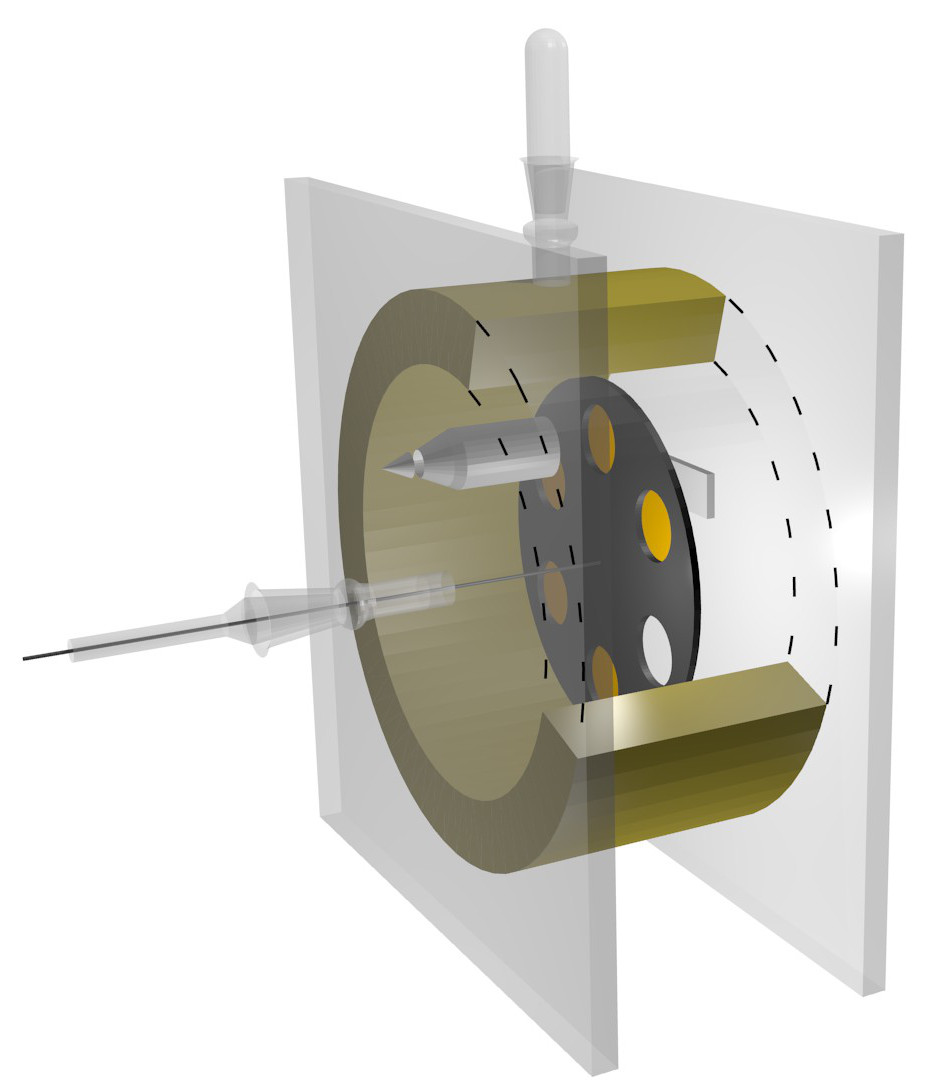
This apparatus was used to measure how the scattering pattern varied in relation to the thickness of the foil, the atomic weight of the material, and the velocity of the alpha particles. The rotating disc in the centre had six holes which could be covered with foil.

Geiger and Marsden then tested how the scattering varied with the thickness of the foil (i.e. if s ∝ t). They constructed a disc (S) with six holes drilled in it. The holes were covered with metal foil (F) of varying thickness, or none for control. This disc was then sealed in a brass ring (A) between two glass plates (B and C). The disc could be rotated by means of a rod (P) to bring each window in front of the alpha particle source (R). On the rear glass pane was a zinc sulfide screen (Z). Geiger and Marsden found that the number of scintillations that appeared on the screen was indeed proportional to the thickness, as long as the thickness was small.

Geiger and Marsden reused the apparatus to measure how the scattering pattern varied with the square of the nuclear charge (i.e. if s ∝ Q_{n}^{2}). Geiger and Marsden did not know what the positive charge of the nucleus of their metals were (they had only just discovered the nucleus existed at all), but they assumed it was proportional to the atomic weight, so they tested whether the scattering was proportional to the atomic weight squared. Geiger and Marsden covered the holes of the disc with foils of gold, tin, silver, copper, and aluminium. They measured each foil's stopping power by equating it to an equivalent thickness of air. They counted the number of scintillations per minute that each foil produced on the screen. They divided the number of scintillations per minute by the respective foil's air equivalent, then divided again by the square root of the atomic weight (Geiger and Marsden knew that for foils of equal stopping power, the number of atoms per unit area is proportional to the square root of the atomic weight). Thus, for each metal, Geiger and Marsden obtained the number of scintillations that a fixed number of atoms produce. For each metal, they then divided this number by the square of the atomic weight, and found that the ratios were about the same. Thus they proved that s ∝ Q_{n}^{2}.

Finally, Geiger and Marsden tested how the scattering varied with the velocity of the alpha particles (i.e. if s ∝ 1/v^{4}). Using the same apparatus, they slowed the alpha particles by placing extra sheets of mica in front of the alpha particle source. They found that, within the range of experimental error, the number of scintillations was indeed proportional to 1/v^{4}.

=== Positive charge on nucleus: 1913 ===
In his 1911 paper (see above), Rutherford assumed that the central charge of the atom was positive, but a negative charge would have fitted his scattering model just as well. In a 1913 paper, Rutherford declared that the "nucleus" (as he now called it) was indeed positively charged, based on the result of experiments exploring the scattering of alpha particles in various gases.

In 1917, Rutherford and his assistant William Kay began exploring the passage of alpha particles through gases such as hydrogen and nitrogen. In this experiment, they shot a beam of alpha particles through hydrogen, and they carefully placed their detector—a zinc sulfide screen—just beyond the range of the alpha particles, which were absorbed by the gas. They nonetheless picked up charged particles of some sort causing scintillations on the screen. Rutherford interpreted this as alpha particles knocking the hydrogen nuclei forwards in the direction of the beam, not backwards.

== Rutherford's scattering model ==
Rutherford begins his 1911 paper with a discussion of Thomson's results on scattering of beta particles, a form of radioactivity that results in high velocity electrons. Thomson's model had electrons circulating inside of a sphere of positive charge. Rutherford highlights the need for compound or multiple scattering events: the deflections predicted for each collision are much less than one degree. He then proposes a model which will produce large deflections on a single encounter: place all of the positive charge at the centre of the sphere and ignore the electron scattering as insignificant. The concentrated charge will explain why most alpha particles do not scatter to any measurable degree – they fly past too far from the charge – and yet particles that do pass very close to the centre scatter through large angles.

=== Maximum nuclear size estimate ===
Rutherford begins his analysis by considering a head-on collision between the alpha particle and atom. This will establish the minimum distance between them, a value which will be used throughout his calculations.

Assuming there are no external forces and that initially the alpha particles are far from the nucleus, the inverse-square law between the charges on the alpha particle and nucleus gives the potential energy gained by the particle as it approaches the nucleus. For head-on collisions between alpha particles and the nucleus, all the kinetic energy of the alpha particle is turned into potential energy and the particle stops and turns back.

Schematic view of a head-on collision between an alpha particle and an atom. The radius of the atom is on the order of 10^{−10} m and the minimum stopping distance is on the order of 10^{−14} m.

Where the particle stops at a distance $r_{\text{min}}$ from the centre, the potential energy matches the original kinetic energy:

$$\frac{1}{2} mv^2 = k \frac{q_\text{a} q_\text{g}}{r_\text{min}}$$

where

$$k = \frac{1}{4\pi \varepsilon_0}$$

Rearranging:
$$r_\text{min} = k \frac{2 q_\text{a} q_\text{g}}{mv^2}$$

For an alpha particle:

- m (mass) = 6.64424×10^{−27} kg = 3.7273×10^{9} eV/c^{2}
- q_{a} (for the alpha particle) = 2 × 1.6×10^{−19} C = 3.2×10^{−19} C
- q_{g} (for gold) = 79 × 1.6×10^{−19} C = 1.27×10^{−17} C
- v (initial velocity) = 2×10^{7} m/s (for this example)

The distance from the alpha particle to the centre of the nucleus (r_{min}) at this point is an upper limit for the nuclear radius. Substituting these in gives the value of about 2.7×10^{−14} m, or 27 fm. (The true radius is about 7.3 fm.) The true radius of the nucleus is not recovered in these experiments because the alphas do not have enough energy to penetrate to more than 27 fm of the nuclear centre, as noted, when the radius of the nucleus of a gold atom is 7.3 fm.

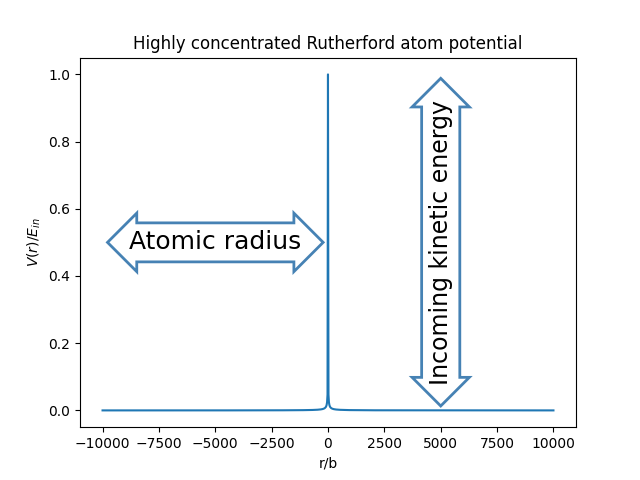
Figure 1. Potential energy diagram for Rutherford's atom model illustrating concentration in the nucleus.

Rutherford's 1911 paper started with a slightly different formula suitable for head-on collision with a sphere of positive charge:

$$\frac{1}{2}mv^2 = NeE \cdot \left (\frac{1}{b} - \frac{3}{2R} + \frac{b^2}{2R^3} \right )$$

In Rutherford's notation, e is the elementary charge, N is the charge number of the nucleus (now also known as the atomic number), and E is the charge of an alpha particle. The convention in Rutherford's time was to measure charge in electrostatic units, distance in centimeters, force in dynes, and energy in ergs. The modern convention is to measure charge in coulombs, distance in meters, force in newtons, and energy in joules. Using coulombs requires using the Coulomb constant (k) in the equation. Rutherford used b as the turning point distance (called r_{min} above) and R is the radius of the atom. The first term is the Coulomb repulsion used above. This form assumes the alpha particle could penetrate the positive charge. At the time of Rutherford's paper, Thomson's plum pudding model proposed a positive charge with the radius of an atom, thousands of times larger than the r_{min} found above. Figure 1 shows how concentrated this potential is compared to the size of the atom. Many of Rutherford's results are expressed in terms of this turning point distance r_{min}, simplifying the results and limiting the need for units to this calculation of turning point.

=== Single scattering by a heavy nucleus ===
From his results for a head on collision, Rutherford knows that alpha particle scattering occurs close to the centre of an atom, at a radius 10,000 times smaller than the atom. The electrons have negligible effect. He begins by assuming no energy loss in the collision, that is he ignores the recoil of the target atom. He will revisit each of these issues later in his paper. Under these conditions, the alpha particle and atom interact through a central force, a physical problem studied first by Isaac Newton. A central force only acts along a line between the particles and when the force varies with the inverse square, like Coulomb force in this case, a detailed theory was developed under the name of the Kepler problem. The well-known solutions to the Kepler problem are called orbits and unbound orbits are hyperbolas. Thus Rutherford proposed that the alpha particle will take a hyperbolic trajectory in the repulsive force near the centre of the atom as shown in Figure 2.

Figure 2. The geometry of Rutherford's scattering formula, based on a diagram in his 1911 paper. The alpha particle is the green dot and moves along the green path, which is a hyperbola with O as its centre and S as its external focus. The atomic nucleus is located at S. A is the apsis, the point of closest approach. b is the impact parameter, the lateral distance between the alpha particle's initial trajectory and the nucleus.

To apply the hyperbolic trajectory solutions to the alpha particle problem, Rutherford expresses the parameters of the hyperbola in terms of the scattering geometry and energies. He starts with conservation of angular momentum. When the particle of mass $m$ and initial velocity $v_0$ is far from the atom, its angular momentum around the centre of the atom will be $m b v_0$ where $b$ is the impact parameter, which is the lateral distance between the alpha particle's path and the atom. At the point of closest approach, labeled A in Figure 2, the angular momentum will be $m r_\text{A} v_\text{A}$. Therefore

$$m b v_0 = m r_\text{A} v_\text{A}$$

$$v_\text{A} = \frac{b v_0}{r_\text{A}}$$

Rutherford also applies the law of conservation of energy between the same two points:

$$\tfrac{1}{2}m v_0^2 = \tfrac{1}{2} m v_\text{A}^2 + \frac{k q_\text{a} q_\text{g}}{r_\text{A}}$$

The left hand side and the first term on the right hand side are the kinetic energies of the particle at the two points; the last term is the potential energy due to the Coulomb force between the alpha particle and atom at the point of closest approach (A). q_{a} is the charge of the alpha particle, q_{g} is the charge of the nucleus, and k is the Coulomb constant. (Note: These equations are in SI units Rutherford uses cgs units)

The energy equation can then be rearranged thus:

$$v_\text{A}^2 =  v_0^2 \left (1 - \frac{k q_\text{a} q_\text{g}}{\tfrac{1}{2} m v_0^2 r_\text{A}} \right)$$

For convenience, the non-geometric physical variables in this equation can be contained in a variable $r_\text{min}$, which is the point of closest approach in a head-on collision scenario which was explored in a previous section of this article:

$$r_\text{min} = \frac{k q_\text{a} q_\text{g}}{\tfrac{1}{2} m v_0^2}$$

This allows Rutherford simplify the energy equation to:

$$v_\text{A}^2 =  v_0^2 \left (1 - \frac{r_\text{min}}{r_\text{A}} \right)$$

This leaves two simultaneous equations for $v_\text{A}^2$, the first derived from the conservation of momentum equation and the second from the conservation of energy equation. Eliminating $v_\text{A}$ and $v_0$ gives at a new formula for $r_\text{min}$:

$$v_\text{A}^2 =  \frac{b^2v_0^2}{r_\text{A}^2} = v_0^2 \left (1 - \frac{r_\text{min}}{r_\text{A}} \right)$$

$$r_\text{min} = r_\text{A} - \frac{b^2}{r_\text{A}}$$

The next step is to find a formula for $r_\text{A}$. From Figure 2, $r_\text{A}$ is the sum of two distances related to the hyperbola, SO and OA. Using the following logic, these distances can be expressed in terms of angle $\Phi$ and impact parameter $b$.

Figure 3 The basic components of the geometry of hyperbolas.

The eccentricity of a hyperbola is a value that describes the hyperbola's shape. It can be calculated by dividing the focal distance by the length of the semi-major axis, which per Figure 2 is SO/OA. As can be seen in Figure 3, the eccentricity is also equal to $\sec\Phi$, where $\Phi$ is the angle between the major axis and the asymptote. Therefore:

$$\frac{\text{SO}}{\text{OA}} = \sec\Phi$$

As can be deduced from Figure 2, the focal distance SO is

$$\text{SO} = b \cdot \csc\Phi$$

and therefore

$$\text{OA} = \frac{\text{SO}}{\sec\Phi} = b \cdot \cot\Phi$$

With these formulas for SO and OA, the distance $r_\text{A}$ can be written in terms of $\Phi$ and simplified using a trigonometric identity known as a half-angle formula:

$$\begin{align}
r_\text{A} &= \text{SO} + \text{OA} \\
\\
&= b \cdot \csc\Phi + b \cdot \cot\Phi \\
\\
&= b \cdot \cot\frac{\Phi}{2}
\end{align}$$

Applying a trigonometric identity known as the cotangent double angle formula and the previous equation for $r_\text{A}$ gives a simpler relationship between the physical and geometric variables:

$$\begin{align}
r_\text{min} &= r_\text{A} - \frac{b^2}{r_\text{A}} \\
\\
&= b\cdot\cot\frac{\Phi}{2} - \frac{b^2}{b\cdot\cot\frac{\Phi}{2}} \\
\\
&= b \frac{\cot^2\frac{\Phi}{2} - 1}{\cot\frac{\Phi}{2}} \\[1ex]
\\
&= 2 b \cdot \cot \Phi
\end{align}$$

The scattering angle of the particle is $\theta = \pi - 2 \Phi$ and therefore $\Phi = \tfrac{\pi - \theta}{2}$. With the help of a trigonometric identity known as a reflection formula, the relationship between θ and b can be resolved to:

$$\begin{align}
r_\text{min} &= 2b \cdot \cot \frac{\pi - \theta}{2} \\[1ex]
\\
&= 2b\cdot\tan \frac{\theta}{2} \\[1ex]
\\
\cot\frac{\theta}{2} &= \frac{2b}{r_\text{min}}
\end{align}$$

which can be rearranged to give

$$\theta = 2 \arctan \frac{r_\text{min}}{2b} = 2 \arctan \frac{k q_\text{a} q_\text{g}}{m v_0^2 b}$$

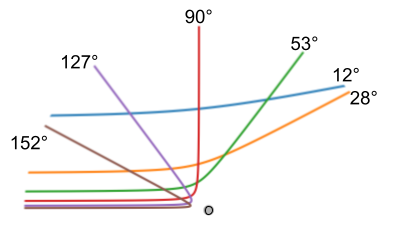
Hyperbolic trajectories of alpha particles scattering from a Gold nucleus (modern radius shown as gray circle) as described in Rutherford's 1911 paper

Rutherford gives some illustrative values as shown in this table:

Rutherford's angle of deviation table
$\tfrac{b}{r_\text{min}}$	10	5	2	1	0.5	0.25	0.125
$\theta$	5.7°	11.4°	28°	53°	90°	127°	152°

Rutherford's approach to this scattering problem remains a standard treatment in textbooks on classical mechanics.

=== Intensity vs angle ===
Geometry of differential scattering cross section

To compare to experiments the relationship between impact parameter and scattering angle needs to be converted to probability versus angle. The scattering cross section gives the relative intensity by angles:
$$\frac{\mathrm{d} \sigma}{\mathrm{d} \Omega}(\Omega) \mathrm{d} \Omega = \frac{\text{number of particles scattered into solid angle } \mathrm{d} \Omega \text{ per unit time}}{\text{incident intensity}}$$

In classical mechanics, the scattering angle $\theta$ is uniquely determined the initial kinetic energy of the incoming particles and the impact parameter b. Therefore, the number of particles scattered into an angle between $\theta$ and $\theta + \mathrm{d}\theta$ must be the same as the number of particles with associated impact parameters between b and b + db. For an incident intensity I, this implies:

$$2\pi I b \cdot \left|\mathrm{d}b\right| =-2 \pi \cdot \sigma (\theta) \cdot I \cdot \sin(\theta) \cdot \mathrm{d}\theta$$

Thus the cross section depends on scattering angle as:

$$\sigma (\theta) = - \frac{b}{\sin\theta} \cdot \frac{\mathrm{d}b}{\mathrm{d}\theta}$$

Using the impact parameter as a function of angle, b(θ), from the single scattering result above produces the Rutherford scattering cross section:

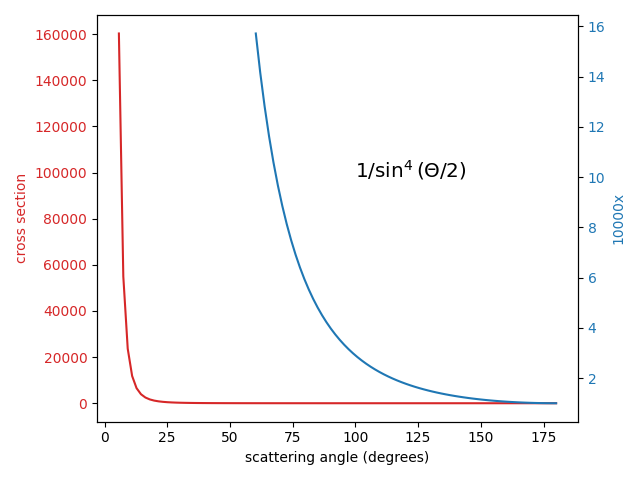
Rutherford scattering cross section is strongly peaked around zero degrees, and yet has nonzero values out to 180 degrees.

$$\sigma(\Theta) = \frac {\csc^4{\frac{\Theta}{2}}}{4} \cdot {\left(\frac {2 q_\text{n} q_\text{a}}{mv^2}\right)}^2$$

- $\sigma(\theta)$ = the relative number of alpha particles scattered by the angle of deflection $\theta$
- q_{n} = positive charge of the atomic nucleus
- q_{a} = positive charge of the alpha particles
- m = mass of an alpha particle
- v = velocity of the alpha particle

This formula predicted the results that Geiger measured in the coming year. The scattering probability into small angles greatly exceeds the probability in to larger angles, reflecting the tiny nucleus surrounded by empty space. However, for rare close encounters, large angle scattering occurs with just a single target.

At the end of his development of the cross section formula, Rutherford emphasises that the results apply to single scattering and thus require measurements with thin foils. For thin foils the degree of scattering is proportional to the foil thickness in agreement with Geiger's measurements.

=== Comparison to JJ Thomson's results ===
In 1910, Thomson presented a model for beta particle scattering which predicted that in the plum pudding model, a beta particle could be scattered by a significant angle after a series of atomic collisions. Rutherford's model produced stronger scattering by concentrating the positive charge of the atom at a central point rather than spread it over the volume of the atom. Then a collision with just one atom could produce a larger effect on a beta particle than Thomson's model. Rutherford completed his analysis including the effects of density and foil thickness, then concluded that thin foils are governed by single collision scattering, not multiple collision scattering.

But Thomson's scattering model could not account for large scattering when it came to alpha particles, which have much more momentum than beta particles. Even with multiple collisions, the possibility of an alpha particle being deflected by any measurable amount is so low as to be meaningless.

=== Target recoil ===
Rutherford's analysis assumed that alpha particle trajectories turned at the centre of the atom but the exit velocity was not reduced. This is equivalent to assuming that the concentrated charge at the centre had infinite mass or was anchored in place. Rutherford discusses the limitations of this assumption by comparing scattering from lighter atoms like aluminium with heavier atoms like gold. If the concentrated charge is lighter it will recoil from the interaction, gaining momentum while the alpha particle loses momentum and consequently slows down.

Modern treatments analyze this type of Coulomb scattering in the centre of mass reference frame. The six coordinates of the two particles (also called "bodies") are converted into three relative coordinates between the two particles and three centre-of-mass coordinates moving in space (called the lab frame). The interaction only occurs in the relative coordinates, giving an equivalent one-body problem just as Rutherford solved, but with different interpretations for the mass and scattering angle.

Rather than the mass of the alpha particle, the more accurate formula including recoil uses reduced mass:

$$\mu = \cfrac{m_1 m_2}{m_1 + m_2}.$$

For Rutherford's alpha particle scattering from gold, with mass of 197, the reduced mass is very close to the mass of the alpha particle:

$$\mu_\text{Au} = \cfrac{4\times 197}{4 + 197} = 3.92 \approx 4$$

For lighter aluminium, with mass 27, the effect is greater:

$$\mu_\text{Al} = \cfrac{4\times 27}{4 + 27} = 3.48$$

a 13% difference in mass. Rutherford notes this difference and suggests experiments be performed with lighter atoms.

The second effect is a change in scattering angle. The angle in the relative coordinate system or centre of mass frame needs to be converted to an angle in the lab frame. In the lab frame, denoted by a subscript L, the scattering angle for a general central potential is

$$\tan \Theta_\text{L} = \frac{\sin\Theta}{\cos\Theta + \frac{m_1}{m_2}}$$

For a heavy particle like gold used by Rutherford, the factor $\tfrac{m_1}{m_2} = \tfrac{4}{197} \approx 0.02$ can be neglected at almost all angles. Then the lab and relative angles are the same, $\Theta_\text{L} \approx \Theta$.

The change in scattering angle alters the formula for differential cross section needed for comparison to experiment. In general the calculation is complex. For the case of alpha-particle scattering from gold atoms, this effect on the cross section is quite small.

== Limitations to Rutherford's scattering formula ==
=== Very light nuclei and higher energies ===
In 1919 Rutherford analyzed alpha particle scattering from hydrogen atoms, showing the limits of the 1911 formula even with corrections for reduced mass. Similar issues with smaller deviations for helium, magnesium, aluminium led to the conclusion that the alpha particle was penetrating the nucleus in these cases. This allowed the first estimates of the size of atomic nuclei. Later experiments based on cyclotron acceleration of alpha particles striking heavier nuclei provided data for analysis of interaction between the alpha particle and the nuclear surface. However at energies that push the alpha particles deeper they are strongly absorbed by the nuclei, a more complex interaction.

=== Quantum mechanics ===
Rutherford's treatment of alpha particle scattering seems to rely on classical mechanics and yet the particles are of sub-atomic dimensions. However the critical aspects of the theory ultimately rely on conservation of momentum and energy. These concepts apply equally in classical and quantum regimes: the scattering ideas developed by Rutherford apply to subatomic elastic scattering problems like neutron-proton scattering.

== Why the plum pudding model was wrong ==
J. J. Thomson himself didn't study alpha particle scattering, but he did study beta particle scattering. In his 1910 paper "On the Scattering of rapidly moving Electrified Particles", Thomson presented several equations that modelled how beta particles scatter in a collision with an atom per the plum pudding model.

The average partial deflection caused by the atomic electrons on an incoming beta particle is

$$\bar\theta_1 = \frac{16}{5} \cdot \frac{k q_\text{e} q_\text{e}}{m v^2 R} \sqrt{\frac{3N}{2}}$$

and the average partial deflection caused by the positive sphere is

$$\bar\theta_2 = \frac{\pi}{4} \cdot \frac{k q_\text{e} q_\text{g}}{m v^2 R}$$

where q_{e} is the elementary charge, q_{g} is the positive charge of the atom, m and v are the mass and velocity of the incoming particle, N is the number of electrons in the atom, and R is the radius of the atom.

The net deflection is given by

$$\bar\theta = \sqrt{\bar\theta_1^2 + \bar\theta_2^2}$$

Thomson did not explain how he developed these equations, but this section will provide an educated guess. At the same time, it will adapt these equations to alpha particle scattering on the assumption that alpha particles are point charges much like beta particles. These equations will then be used to show that Thomson's model was inconsistent with the experimental results of Geiger and Marsden.

=== Partial deflection by the positive sphere ===
Consider an alpha particle passing by a sphere of pure positive charge (no electrons) with a radius R. The sphere is so much heavier than the alpha particle that we do not account for recoil. Its position is fixed. The alpha particle passes just close enough to graze the edge of the sphere, which is where the electric field of the sphere is strongest.

Figure 4

An earlier section of this article presented an equation which models how an incoming charged particle is deflected by another charged particle at a fixed position (ie infinite mass).

$$\theta = 2 \arctan {\frac{k q_1 q_2}{m v^2 b}}$$

This equation can be used to calculate the deflection angle in the special case in Figure 4 by setting the impact parameter b to the same value as the radius of the sphere R. So long as the alpha particle does not penetrate the sphere, there is no difference between a sphere of charge and a point charge, a mathematical result known as the Shell theorem.

- q_{g} = positive charge of the gold atom = 79 q_{e} = 1.26×10^{−17} C
- q_{a} = charge of the alpha particle = 2 q_{e} = 3.20×10^{−19} C
- R = radius of the gold atom = 1.44×10^{−10} m
- v = speed of the alpha particle = 1.53×10^{7} m/s
- m = mass of the alpha particle = 6.64×10^{−27} kg
- k = Coulomb constant = 8.987×10^{9} N·m^{2}/C^{2}

$$\theta_2 = 2 \arctan {\frac{k q_\text{a} q_\text{g}}{m v^2 R}} \approx 0.02  \text{ degrees}$$

This shows that the largest possible deflection will be very small, to the point that the path of the alpha particle passing through the positive sphere of a gold atom is almost a straight line. Therefore in computing the average deflection, which will be smaller still, we will treat the particle's path through the sphere as a chord of length L.

Figure 5

Inside a sphere of uniformly distributed positive charge, the force exerted on the alpha particle at any point along its path through the sphere is

$$F = \frac{k q_\text{a} q_\text{g}}{r^2} \cdot \frac{r^3}{R^3}$$

The lateral component of this force is

$$F_\text{y} = \frac{k q_\text{a} q_\text{g}}{r^2} \cdot \frac{r^3}{R^3} \cdot \cos\varphi = \frac{b k q_\text{a} q_\text{g}}{R^3}$$

The lateral change in momentum p_{y} is therefore

$$\Delta p_\text{y} = F_\text{y} t =\frac{b k q_\text{a} q_\text{g}}{R^3} \cdot \frac{L}{v}$$

The deflection angle $\theta_2$ is given by

$$\tan\theta_2 = \frac{\Delta p_\text{y}}{p_\text{x}} = \frac{b k q_\text{a} q_\text{g}}{R^3} \cdot \frac{L}{v} \cdot \frac{1}{mv}$$

where p_{x} is the average horizontal momentum, which is first reduced then restored as horizontal force changes direction as the alpha particle goes across the sphere. Since the deflection is very small, $\tan\theta_2$ can be treated as equal to $\theta_2$. The chord length $L = 2 \sqrt{R^2 - b^2}$, per Pythagorean theorem.

The average deflection angle $\bar\theta_2$ sums the angle for values of b and L across the entire sphere and divides by the cross section of the sphere:

$$\begin{align}
\bar\theta_2 &= \frac{1}{\pi R^2} \int_0^R \frac{b k q_\text{a} q_\text{g}}{R^3} \cdot \frac{2\sqrt{R^2 - b^2}}{v} \cdot \frac{1}{mv} \cdot 2\pi b \cdot \mathrm{d}b \\[1ex]
\\
&= \frac{\pi}{4} \cdot \frac{k q_\text{a} q_\text{g}}{mv^2R}
\end{align}$$

This matches Thomson's formula in his 1910 paper.

=== Partial deflection by the electrons ===
Consider an alpha particle passing through an atom of radius R along a path of length L. The effect of the positive sphere is ignored so as to isolate the effect of the atomic electrons. As with the positive sphere, deflection by the electrons is expected to be very small, to the point that the path is practically a straight line.

Figure 6

An earlier section of this article presented an equation which models how an incoming charged particle is deflected by another charged particle at a fixed position.

$$\theta = 2 \arctan {\frac{k q_1 q_2}{m v^2 b}}$$

m and v are the mass and velocity of the incoming particle and b is the impact parameter.

For the electrons within an arbitrary distance s of the alpha particle's path, their mean distance will be s/2. Therefore, the average deflection per electron will be

$$2 \arctan \frac{k q_\text{a} q_\text{e}}{mv^2 \tfrac{s}{2}} \approx \frac{4k q_\text{a} q_\text{e}}{mv^2 s}$$

where q_{e} is the elementary charge. The average net deflection by all the electrons within this arbitrary cylinder of effect around the alpha particle's path is

$$\theta_1 = \frac{4k q_\text{a} q_\text{e}}{mv^2 s} \sqrt{N_0 \pi s^2 L}$$

where N_{0} is the number of electrons per unit volume and $\pi s^2 L$ is the volume of this cylinder.

Figure 7

Treating L as a straight line, $L = 2\sqrt{R^2 - b^2}$ where b is the distance of this line from the centre. The mean of $\sqrt{L}$ is therefore

$$\frac{1}{\pi R^2} \int_0^R \sqrt{2 \sqrt{R^2 - b^2}} \cdot 2\pi b \cdot \mathrm{d}b = \frac{4}{5} \sqrt{2R}$$

To obtain the mean deflection $\bar{\theta}_1$, replace $\sqrt{L}$ in the equation for $\theta_1$:

$$\begin{align}
\bar{\theta}_1 &= \frac{4k q_\text{a} q_\text{e}}{mv^2 s} \sqrt{N_0 \pi s^2} \cdot \frac{4}{5} \sqrt{2R} \\[1ex]
\\
&= \frac{16}{5} \cdot \frac{k q_\text{a} q_\text{e}}{m v^2 R} \sqrt{\frac{3N}{2}}
\end{align}$$

where N is the number of electrons in the atom, equal to $N_0 \tfrac{4}{3} \pi R^3$.

=== Cumulative effect ===
Applying Thomson's equations described above to an alpha particle colliding with a gold atom, using the following values:

- q_{g} = positive charge of the gold atom = 79 q_{e} = 1.26×10^{−17} C
- q_{a} = charge of the alpha particle = 2 q_{e} = 3.20×10^{−19} C
- q_{e} = elementary charge = 1.602×10^{−19} C
- R = radius of the gold atom = 1.44×10^{−10} m
- v = speed of the alpha particle = 1.53×10^{7} m/s
- m = mass of the alpha particle = 6.64×10^{−27} kg
- k = Coulomb constant = 8.987×10^{9} N·m^{2}/C^{2}
- N = number of electrons in the gold atom = 79

gives the average partial angle by which the alpha particle should be deflected by the atomic electrons as:

$$\bar\theta_1 = \frac{16}{5} \cdot \frac{k q_\text{a} q_\text{e}}{mv^2 R} \sqrt{\frac{3N}{2}} \approx 0.00007 \text{ radians or } 0.004 \text{ degrees}$$

and the average partial deflection caused by the positive sphere is:

$$\bar\theta_2 = \frac{\pi}{4} \cdot \frac{k q_\text{a} q_\text{g}}{mv^2 R} \approx 0.00013 \text{ radians or 0.007 degrees}$$

The net deflection for a single atomic collision is:

$$\bar\theta = \sqrt{\bar\theta_1^2 + \bar\theta_2^2} \approx 0.008 \text{ degrees}$$

On average the positive sphere and the electrons alike provide very little deflection in a single collision. Thomson's model combined many single-scattering events from the atom's electrons and a positive sphere. Each collision may increase or decrease the total scattering angle. Only very rarely would a series of collisions all line up in the same direction. The result is similar to the standard statistical problem called a random walk. If the average deflection angle of the alpha particle in a single collision with an atom is $\bar{\theta}$, then the average deflection after n collisions is

$$\bar\theta_n = \bar{\theta}\sqrt{n}$$

The probability that an alpha particle will be deflected by a total of more than 90° after n deflections is given by:

$$e^{-(90 / \bar\theta_n)^2}$$

where e is Euler's number (≈2.71828...). A gold foil with a thickness of 1.5 micrometers would be about 10,000 atoms thick. If the average deflection per atom is 0.008°, the average deflection after 10,000 collisions would be 0.8°. The probability of an alpha particle being deflected by more than 90° will be

$$e^{-(90 / 0.8)^2} \approx e^{-12656} \approx 10^{-5946}$$

While in Thomson's plum pudding model it is mathematically possible that an alpha particle could be deflected by more than 90° after 10,000 collisions, the probability of such an event is so low as to be undetectable. Geiger and Marsden should not have detected any alpha particles coming back in the experiment they performed in 1909, and yet they did.

== Notes on historical measurements ==
Rutherford assumed that the radius of atoms in general to be on the order of 10^{−10} m and the positive charge of a gold atom to be about 100 times that of hydrogen (100 q_{e}). The atomic weight of gold was known to be around 197 since early in the 19th century. From an experiment in 1906, Rutherford measured alpha particles to have a charge of 2 q_{e} and an atomic weight of 4, and alpha particles emitted by radon to have velocity of 1.70×10^{7} m/s. Rutherford deduced that alpha particles are essentially helium atoms stripped of two electrons, but at the time scientists only had a rough idea of how many electrons atoms have and so the alpha particle was thought to have up to 10 electrons left. In 1906, J. J. Thomson measured the elementary charge to be about 3.4×10^{−10} esu (1.3×10^{−19} C). In 1909 Robert A. Millikan provided a more accurate measurement of 1.5924×10^{−19} C, only 0.6% off the current accepted measurement. Jean Perrin in 1909 measured the mass of the hydrogen atom to be 1.43×10^{−27} kg, and if an alpha particle is four times as heavy as that, it would have an absolute mass of 5.72×10^{−27} kg.

The convention in Rutherford's time was to measure charge in electrostatic units, distance in centimeters, force in dynes, and energy in ergs. The modern convention is to measure charge in coulombs, distance in meters, force in newtons, and energy in joules. Using coulombs requires using the Coulomb constant in certain equations. In this article, Rutherford and Thomson's equations have been rewritten to fit modern notation conventions.

== See also ==
- Atomic theory
- Rutherford backscattering spectroscopy
- List of scattering experiments

== Bibliography ==
- "Rutherford's Nuclear World: The Story of the Discovery of the Nucleus". American Institute of Physics.
- "Rutherford scattering". HyperPhysics. Georgia State University.
- Arthur Beiser (1969). Perspectives of Modern Physics. McGraw-Hill Book Company.
- Arthur Stewart Eve (1939). Rutherford: Being the Life and Letters of the Rt. Hon. Lord Rutherford, O. M. MacMillan.
- Ernest Rutherford (1899). "Uranium Radiation and the Electrical conduction Produced by it". Philosophical Magazine. 47 (284): 109–163.
- Ernest Rutherford (1911). "The Scattering of α and β Particles by Matter and the Structure of the Atom" (PDF). Philosophical Magazine. Series 6. 21 (125): 669–688. Bibcode:1911LEDPM..21..669R. doi:10.1080/14786440508637080.
- Ernest Rutherford (1906). "The Mass and Velocity of the α particles expelled from Radium and Actinium". Philosophical Magazine. Series 6. 12 (70): 348–371. doi:10.1080/14786440609463549.
- Ernest Rutherford (1912). "The origin of β and γ rays from radioactive substances". Philosophical Magazine. Series 6. 24 (142): 453–462. doi:10.1080/14786441008637351.
- Ernest Rutherford; John Mitchell Nuttal (1913). "Scattering of α-Particles by Gases". Philosophical Magazine. Series 6. 26 (154): 702–712. doi:10.1080/14786441308635014.
- Ernest Rutherford (1914). "The Structure of the Atom". Philosophical Magazine. Series 6. 27 (159): 488–498. doi:10.1080/14786440308635117.
- Ernest Rutherford (1938). "Forty Years of Physics". In Needham, Joseph; Pagel, Walter (eds.). Background to Modern Science: Ten Lectures at Cambridge arranged by the History of Science Committee 1936. Cambridge University Press.
- Ernest Rutherford (1913). Radioactive Substances and their Radiations. Cambridge University Press.
- Ernest Rutherford (1936). "Radioactivity and Atomic Structure". Journal of the Chemical Society. 1936: 508–516. doi:10.1039/JR9360000508.
- "Geiger and Marsden". Cavendish Laboratory. Archived from the original on 2014-10-06.
- John Daintith; Derek Gjertsen (1999). A Dictionary of Scientists. Oxford University Press. ISBN 978-0-19-280086-2.
- Michael Fowler. "Rutherford Scattering". Lecture notes for Physics 252. University of Virginia.
- Hans Geiger (1908). "On the Scattering of α-Particles by Matter". Proceedings of the Royal Society of London A. 81 (546): 174–177. Bibcode:1908RSPSA..81..174G. doi:10.1098/rspa.1908.0067.
- Hans Geiger; Ernest Marsden (1909). "On a Diffuse Reflection of the α-Particles". Proceedings of the Royal Society of London A. 82 (557): 495–500. Bibcode:1909RSPSA..82..495G. doi:10.1098/rspa.1909.0054.
- Hans Geiger (1910). "The Scattering of the α-Particles by Matter". Proceedings of the Royal Society of London A. 83 (565): 492–504. Bibcode:1910RSPSA..83..492G. doi:10.1098/rspa.1910.0038.
- Hans Geiger; Ernest Marsden (1913). "The Laws of Deflexion of α Particles through Large Angles" (PDF). Philosophical Magazine. Series 6. 25 (148): 604–623. doi:10.1080/14786440408634197.
- John L. Heilbron (January 1968). "The Scattering of α and β Particles and Rutherford's Atom". Archive for History of Exact Sciences. 4 (4): 247–307. doi:10.1007/BF00411591.
- John L. Heilbron (2003). Ernest Rutherford and the Explosion of Atoms. Oxford University Press. ISBN 978-0-19-512378-4.
- John W. Jewett Jr.; Raymond A. Serway (2014). "Early Models of the Atom". Physics for Scientists and Engineers with Modern Physics (9th ed.). Brooks/Cole. p. 1299.
- Joy Manners (2000). Quantum Physics: An Introduction. CRC Press. ISBN 978-0-7503-0720-8.
- Hantaro Nagaoka (1904). "Kinetics of a System of Particles illustrating the Line and the Band Spectrum and the Phenomena of Radioactivity". Philosophical Magazine. Series 6. 7 (41): 445–455. doi:10.1080/14786440409463141.
- Richard Reeves (2008). A Force of Nature: The Frontier Genius of Ernest Rutherford. W. W. Norton & Co. ISBN 978-0-393-07604-2.
- J. A. Crowther (1910). "On the Scattering of Homogeneous β-Rays and the Number of Electrons in the Atom". Proceedings of the Royal Society of London. 84 (570): 226–247. Bibcode:1910RSPSA..84..226C. doi:10.1098/rspa.1910.0074.
- Joseph J. Thomson (1904). "On the Structure of the Atom: an Investigation of the Stability and Periods of Oscillation of a number of Corpuscles arranged at equal intervals around the Circumference of a Circle; with Application of the Results to the Theory of Atomic Structure". Philosophical Magazine. Series 6. 7 (39): 237. doi:10.1080/14786440409463107.
- J. J. Thomson (1906). "On the Number of Corpuscles in an Atom" (PDF). Philosophical Magazine. 6. 11 (66): 769–781. doi:10.1080/14786440609463496.
- J. J. Thomson (1910). "On the Scattering of rapidly moving Electrified Particles". Proceedings of the Cambridge Philosophical Society. 15: 465–471.
- Gary Tibbetts (2007). How the Great Scientists Reasoned: The Scientific Method in Action. Elsevier. ISBN 978-0-12-398498-2.
- Jean Perrin (1910) [1909]. Brownian Movement and Molecular Reality. Translated by F. Soddy. Taylor and Francis.
- E. A. Davis; I. J. Falconer (1997). J. J. Thomson and the Discovery of the Electron. Taylor & Francis. ISBN 0-7484-0720-0.
- Giora Hon; Bernard R. Goldstein (6 September 2013). "J. J. Thomson's plum-pudding atomic model: The making of a scientific myth". Annalen der Physik. 525 (8–9): A129–A133. Bibcode:2013AnP...525A.129H. doi:10.1002/andp.201300732.
- J. J. Thomson (1907). The Corpuscular Theory of Matter. Charles Scribner's Sons.
- Goldstein, Herbert; Poole, Charles; Safko, John (2002). Classical Mechanics (third ed.). Addison-Wesley. ISBN 978-0-201-65702-9.
- Tong, David. "Lectures on Dynamics and Relativity". University of Cambridge. Chapter 4 Central forces
