= Ernest Marsden =

British physicist (1889–1970)

Sir Ernest Marsden CMG CBE MC FRS
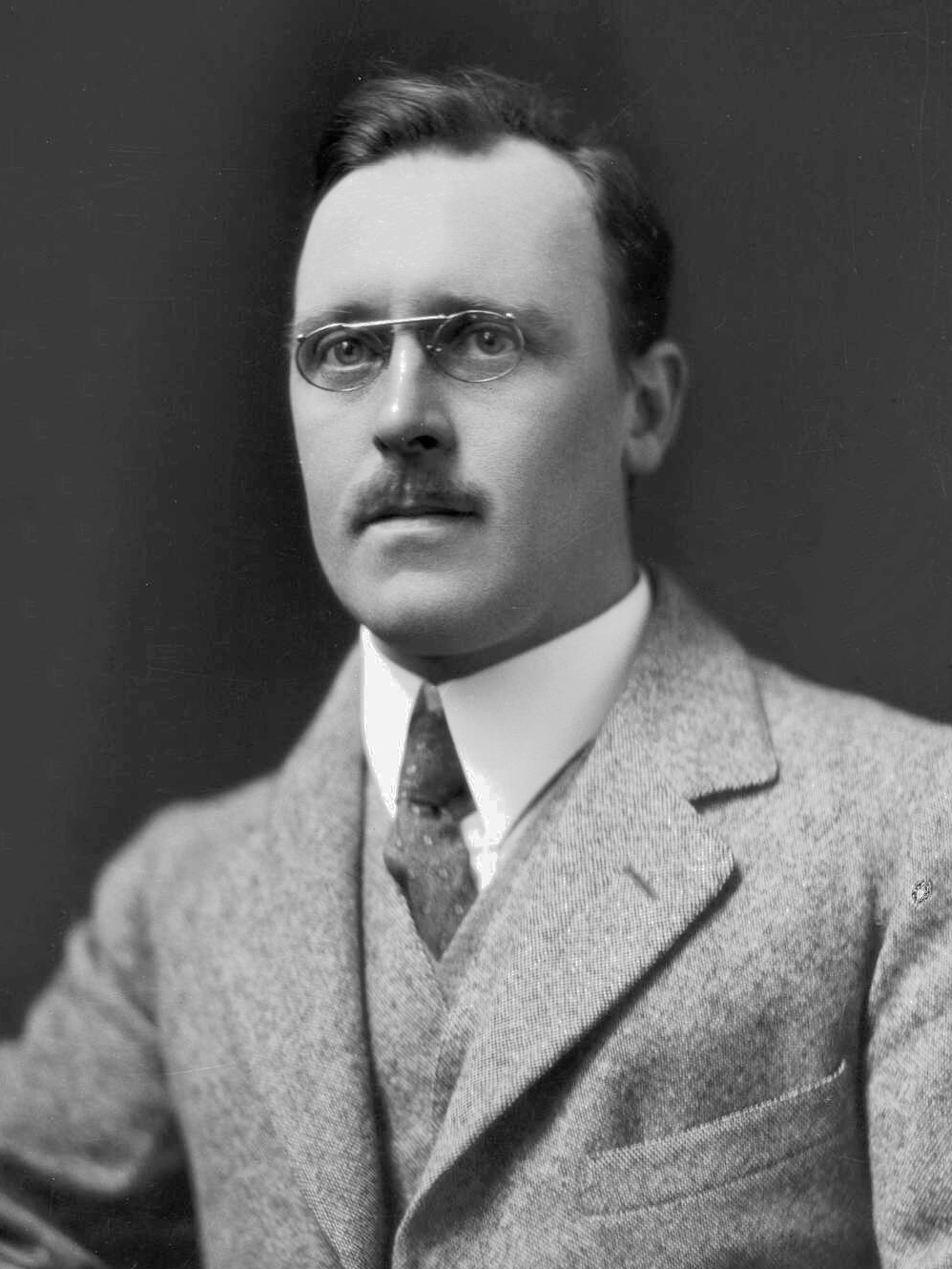
- Born: 19 February 1889; Rishton, Lancashire, England
- Died: 15 December 1970 (aged 81); Wellington, New Zealand
- Education: University of Manchester
- Known for: Geiger–Marsden experiment
- Awards: Fellow of the Royal Society
- Scientific career
- Workplaces: Victoria University College; New Zealand DSIR

Sir Ernest Marsden CMG CBE MC FRS (19 February 1889 – 15 December 1970) was an English-New Zealand physicist. He is recognised internationally for his contributions to science while working under Ernest Rutherford, which led to the discovery of new theories on the structure of the atom. In Marsden's later work in New Zealand, he became a significant member of the scientific community, while maintaining close links to the United Kingdom.

== Education ==
Born in Manchester, the son of Thomas Marsden and Phoebe Holden, Marsden lived in Rishton and attended Queen Elizabeth's Grammar School, Blackburn, where an inter-house trophy rewarding academic excellence ('The Marsden Merit Trophy') bears his name.

In 1909, as a 20-year-old student at the University of Manchester, he met and began work under Ernest Rutherford. While still an undergraduate he conducted the famous Geiger–Marsden experiment, also called the gold foil experiment, together with Hans Geiger under Rutherford's supervision. This experiment led to Rutherford's new theory for the structure of the atom, with a centralised concentration of mass and positive charge surrounded by empty space and a sea of orbiting negatively charged electrons. Rutherford later described this as "almost as incredible as if you fired a 15-inch shell at a piece of tissue paper and it came back to hit you".

The apparatus used in the experiment was an early version of what was to become the Geiger counter.

In 1915, he moved to Victoria University College in Wellington, New Zealand, to replace Thomas Laby as Professor of Physics; Rutherford recommended his appointment there.

== Career ==
Marsden served in France during World War I as a Royal Engineer in a special sound-ranging section and was awarded the Military Cross in the 1919 King's Birthday Honours.

In 1922 Marsden turned from his research and position as Professor of Physics to bureaucracy. He was appointed Assistant Director of Education before accepting the position of Secretary of New Zealand's new Department of Scientific and Industrial Research (DSIR) in 1926. The new Department's focus was on assisting primary industries, and Marsden worked to organise research particularly in the area of agriculture.

Marsden initiated a number of projects that kept New Zealand in touch with international developments in the field of radiation and nuclear sciences. In 1939 he pioneered the non-medical use of radioisotopes in New Zealand, and conducted a series of experiments to determine the role of cobalt in animal metabolism.

With the outbreak of World War II Marsden was given the title of Director of Scientific Developments, and was charged with mobilizing New Zealand's scientific manpower. During the War he worked on radar research, setting up a team to develop the radar equipment for use in the Pacific. Marsden also used his scientific connections to form a team of young New Zealand scientists who would participate in the American Manhattan Project developing the nuclear bomb, and initiated the search for uranium, the raw material needed for nuclear projects, in New Zealand.

Marsden had a post-war vision of a nuclear New Zealand, with scientists working on research using local nuclear reactors, and developing connections with the British nuclear energy and weapons program. While this vision was not fully realised, in 1946 he established a team of scientists to carry out research into atomic energy and the application of nuclear science to problems in agriculture, health, and industry. Ties between Marsden and the scientific community in Britain remained strong, and in 1947 he became the DSIR's scientific liaison officer in London.

Marsden retired in 1954 and returned to Wellington, where he continued to work and travel extensively, serving on a number of committees and conducting research into environmental radioactivity. As his studies turned to the impact of fallout from radioactive bombs, Marsden came to oppose testing and the development of nuclear weapons. While Marsden had a significant role in establishing and encouraging nuclear science in New Zealand, this role of speaking out against nuclear weapons development and testing - which he only did after the British nuclear testing program was complete - is less known.

In 1966, the same year France began testing nuclear bombs in the Pacific, Marsden suffered a stroke after which he used a wheelchair. He later died at his home in Lowry Bay, Lower Hutt on the shores of Wellington Harbour in 1970.

== Family life ==
Marsden married Margaret Sutcliffe, a school teacher, in 1913. They had two children together, a son and a daughter. After Marsden's final retirement to New Zealand, Maggie (who had been suffering from heart disease) died on 7 November 1956. Two years later, on 26 June 1958, Marsden married Joyce Winifred Chote, who was 30 years his junior. She assisted him in his remaining years, joining him on his travels and supporting him during his research.

== Honours and awards ==
Marsden's career recognitions included fellowship in the Royal Society of London in 1946, president of the Royal Society of New Zealand in 1947 and the Rutherford Memorial Lecture in 1948. In 1961 he chaired the Rutherford Jubilee Conference in Manchester, which celebrated 50 years since Rutherford's discovery of the atomic nucleus.

In 1935, he was awarded the King George V Silver Jubilee Medal and appointed a Commander of the Order of the British Empire in the Silver Jubilee and King's Birthday Honours. He was appointed a Companion of the Order of St Michael and St George in the 1946 New Year Honours. In 1953, Marsden was awarded the Queen Elizabeth II Coronation Medal, and he was made a Knight Bachelor in the 1958 New Year Honours, for services to science.

== Honorific eponyms ==
The Marsden Fund for basic research in New Zealand was set up in 1994.

Massey University has named a major lecture theatre after him.
