= Coulomb scattering =

Physical interaction of charged particles

Coulomb scattering is the elastic scattering of charged particles by the Coulomb interaction. The physical phenomenon was used by Ernest Rutherford in a classic 1911 paper that eventually led to the widespread use of scattering in particle physics to study subatomic matter. The details of Coulomb scattering vary with the mass and properties of the target particles, leading to special subtypes and a variety of applications. Rutherford scattering refers to two nuclear particles and is exploited by the materials science community in an analytical technique called Rutherford backscattering. Electron on nuclei are employed in electron polarimeters and, for coherent electron sources, in many different kinds of electron diffraction.

== History ==
Couloumb scattering, especially as a means for studying atomic, nuclear and subatomic systems, began with Ernest Rutherford's alpha particle scattering model of 1911. The ingredients in Rutherford's approach were well known at the time. The Coulomb force acts as central force along a line between two particles and varies with the inverse square, matching a detailed theory developed under the name of the Kepler problem. JJ Thomson had applied some of the ideas in his 1910 paper on beta particle scattering.

=== Scattering theory and atomic models ===
Left: Had Thomson's model been correct, all the alpha particles should have passed through the foil with minimal scattering. Right: What Geiger and Marsden observed was that a small fraction of the alpha particles experienced strong deflection.

In a 1909 experiment, Geiger and Marsden discovered that the metal foils could scatter some alpha particles in all directions, sometimes more than 90°. This should have been impossible according to the then current Plum pudding model of the atom. According to this model, by JJ Thomson, the atom consists of a sphere of positive charge filled with circulating electrons.

The extreme scattering observed forced Rutherford to revise the model of the atom. The issue in Thomson's model was that the charges were too diffuse to produce a sufficiently strong electrostatic force to cause such repulsion. In Rutherford's new model, the positive charge does not fill the entire volume of the atom but instead constitutes a tiny nucleus at least 10,000 times smaller than the atom as a whole. All that positive charge concentrated in a much smaller volume produces a much stronger electric field near its surface. The nucleus also carried most of the atom's mass. This meant that it could deflect alpha particles by up to 180° depending on how close they pass. The electrons surround this nucleus, spread throughout the atom's volume. Because their negative charge is diffuse and their combined mass is low, they have a negligible effect on the alpha particle.

To verify his model, Rutherford developed a scientific model to predict the intensity of alpha particles at the different angles they scattered coming out of the gold foil, assuming all of the positive charge was concentrated at the centre of the atom. This model was validated in an experiment performed in 1913. His model explained both the beta scattering results of Thomson and the alpha scattering results of Geiger and Marsden.

== Rutherford's scattering model ==
The historical and pedological starting point for Coulomb scattering is Rutherford's nuclear particle scattering. Rutherford's 1911 paper has become a classic and his approach is repeated in modern references. He uses conservation of energy and of momentum to set the parameters of particle trajectories. An alternative approach based on Newtonian force diagrams is described in § Force based alpha particle scattering

Rutherford begins his paper with a discussion of Thomson's results on scattering of beta particles, a form of radioactivity that results in high velocity electrons. Thomson's model had electrons circulating inside of a sphere of positive charge. Coulomb scattering for Thomson's model is described in § Scattering by a uniform sphere

Rutherford highlights that this model requires compound or multiple scattering events: the deflections predicted for each collision are much less than one degree. Thomson's simple model for the effect of multiple scattering is discussed in § Cumulative effect.

Rutherford then proposes a model which will produce large deflections on a single encounter: place all of the positive charge at the centre of the sphere and ignore the electron scattering as insignificant. The concentrated charge will explain why most alpha particles do not scatter to any measurable degree – they fly past too far from the charge – and yet particles that do pass very close to the centre scatter through large angles.

=== Maximum nuclear size estimate ===
Rutherford begins his quantitative analysis by considering a head-on collision between the alpha particle and atom. This will establish the minimum distance between them, a value which will be used throughout his calculations.

Assuming there are no external forces and that initially the alpha particles are far from the nucleus, the inverse-square law between the charges on the alpha particle and nucleus gives the potential energy gained by the particle as it approaches the nucleus. For head-on collisions between alpha particles and the nucleus, all the kinetic energy of the alpha particle is turned into potential energy and the particle stops and turns back.

Schematic view of a head-on collision between an alpha particle and an atom. The radius of the atom is on the order of 10^{−10} m and the minimum stopping distance is on the order of 10^{−14} m.

Where the particle stops at a distance $r_{\text{min}}$ from the centre, the potential energy matches the original kinetic energy:

$$\frac{1}{2} mv^2 = k \frac{q_\text{a} q_\text{g}}{r_\text{min}}$$

where

$$k = \frac{1}{4\pi \epsilon_0}$$

Rearranging:
$$r_\text{min} = k \frac{2 q_\text{a} q_\text{g}}{mv^2}$$

For an alpha particle: (Note: The convention in Rutherford's time was to measure charge in electrostatic units, distance in centimeters, force in dynes, and energy in ergs. The modern convention is to measure charge in coulombs, distance in meters, force in newtons, and energy in joules. Using coulombs requires using the Coulomb constant in certain equations. In this article, Rutherford and Thomson's equations have been rewritten to fit modern notation conventions.)

- m (mass) = 6.64424×10^{−27} kg = 3.7273×10^{9} eV/c^{2}
- q_{a} (for the alpha particle) = 2 × 1.6×10^{−19} C = 3.2×10^{−19} C
- q_{g} (for gold) = 79 × 1.6×10^{−19} C = 1.27×10^{−17} C
- v (initial velocity) = 2×10^{7} m/s (for this example)

The distance from the alpha particle to the centre of the nucleus (r_{min}) at this point is an upper limit for the nuclear radius. Substituting these in gives the value of about 2.7×10^{−14} m, or 27 fm. (The true radius is about 7.3 fm.) The true radius of the nucleus is not recovered in these experiments because the alphas do not have enough energy to penetrate to more than 27 fm of the nuclear centre, as noted, when the actual radius of gold is 7.3 fm.

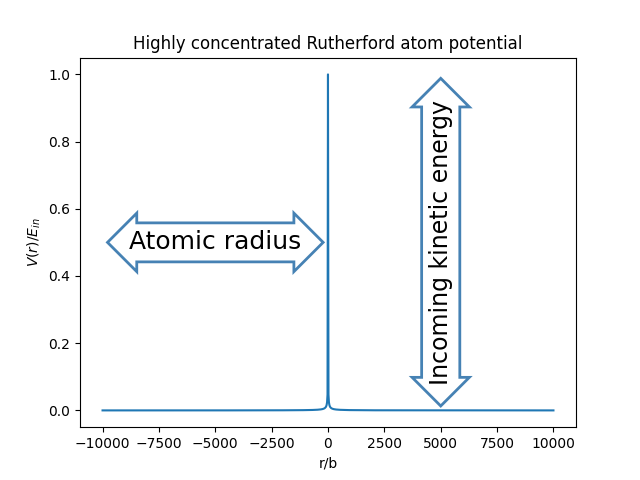
Figure 1. Potential energy diagram for Rutherford's atom model illustrating concentration in the nucleus.

Rutherford's 1911 paper started with a slightly different formula suitable for head-on collision with a sphere of positive charge:

$$\frac{1}{2}mv^2 = NeE \cdot \left (\frac{1}{b} - \frac{3}{2R} + \frac{b^2}{2R^3} \right )$$

In Rutherford's notation, e is the elementary charge, N is the charge number of the nucleus (now also known as the atomic number), and E is the charge of an alpha particle. The convention in Rutherford's time was to measure charge in electrostatic units, distance in centimeters, force in dynes, and energy in ergs. The modern convention is to measure charge in coulombs, distance in meters, force in newtons, and energy in joules. Using coulombs requires using the Coulomb constant (k) in the equation. Rutherford used b as the turning point distance (called r_{min} above) and R is the radius of the atom. The first term is the Coulomb repulsion used above. This form assumes the alpha particle could penetrate the positive charge. At the time of Rutherford's paper, Thomson's plum pudding model proposed a positive charge with the radius of an atom, thousands of times larger than the r_{min} found above. Figure 1 shows how concentrated this potential is compared to the size of the atom. Many of Rutherford's results are expressed in terms of this turning point distance r_{min}, simplifying the results and limiting the need for units to this calculation of turning point.

=== Single scattering by a heavy nucleus ===
From his results for a head on collision, Rutherford knows that alpha particle scattering occurs close to the centre of an atom, at a radius 10,000 times smaller than the atom. The electrons have negligible effect. He begins by assuming no energy loss in the collision, that is he ignores the recoil of the target atom. He will revisit each of these issues later in his paper. Under these conditions, the alpha particle and atom interact through a central force, a physical problem studied first by Isaac Newton. A central force only acts along a line between the particles and when the force varies with the inverse square, like Coulomb force in this case, a detailed theory was developed under the name of the Kepler problem. The well-known solutions to the Kepler problem are called orbits and unbound orbits are hyperbolas. Thus Rutherford proposed that the alpha particle will take a hyperbolic trajectory in the repulsive force near the centre of the atom as shown in Figure 2.

Figure 2. The geometry of Rutherford's scattering formula, based on a diagram in his 1911 paper. The alpha particle is the green dot and moves along the green path, which is a hyperbola with O as its centre and S as its external focus. The atomic nucleus is located at S. A is the apsis, the point of closest approach. b is the impact parameter, the lateral distance between the alpha particle's initial trajectory and the nucleus.

To apply the hyperbolic trajectory solutions to the alpha particle problem, Rutherford expresses the parameters of the hyperbola in terms of the scattering geometry and energies. He starts with conservation of angular momentum. When the particle of mass $m$ and initial velocity $v_0$ is far from the atom, its angular momentum around the centre of the atom will be $m b v_0$ where $b$ is the impact parameter, which is the lateral distance between the alpha particle's path and the atom. At the point of closest approach, labeled A in Figure 2, the angular momentum will be $m r_\text{A} v_\text{A}$. Therefore

$$m b v_0 = m r_\text{A} v_\text{A}$$

$$v_\text{A} = \frac{b v_0}{r_\text{A}}$$

Rutherford also applies the law of conservation of energy between the same two points:

$$\tfrac{1}{2}m v_0^2 = \tfrac{1}{2} m v_\text{A}^2 + \frac{k q_\text{a} q_\text{g}}{r_\text{A}}$$

The left hand side and the first term on the right hand side are the kinetic energies of the particle at the two points; the last term is the potential energy due to the Coulomb force between the alpha particle and atom at the point of closest approach (A). q_{a} is the charge of the alpha particle, q_{g} is the charge of the nucleus, and k is the Coulomb constant. (Note: These equations are in SI units Rutherford uses cgs units)

The energy equation can then be rearranged thus:

$$v_\text{A}^2 =  v_0^2 \left (1 - \frac{k q_\text{a} q_\text{g}}{\tfrac{1}{2} m v_0^2 r_\text{A}} \right)$$

For convenience, the non-geometric physical variables in this equation can be contained in a variable $r_\text{min}$, which is the point of closest approach in a head-on collision scenario which was explored in a previous section of this article:

$$r_\text{min} = \frac{k q_\text{a} q_\text{g}}{\tfrac{1}{2} m v_0^2}$$

This allows Rutherford simplify the energy equation to:

$$v_\text{A}^2 =  v_0^2 \left (1 - \frac{r_\text{min}}{r_\text{A}} \right)$$

This leaves two simultaneous equations for $v_\text{A}^2$, the first derived from the conservation of momentum equation and the second from the conservation of energy equation. Eliminating $v_\text{A}$ and $v_0$ gives at a new formula for $r_\text{min}$:

$$v_\text{A}^2 =  \frac{b^2v_0^2}{r_\text{A}^2} = v_0^2 \left (1 - \frac{r_\text{min}}{r_\text{A}} \right)$$

$$r_\text{min} = r_\text{A} - \frac{b^2}{r_\text{A}}$$

The next step is to find a formula for $r_\text{A}$. From Figure 2, $r_\text{A}$ is the sum of two distances related to the hyperbola, SO and OA. Using the following logic, these distances can be expressed in terms of angle $\Phi$ and impact parameter $b$.

Figure 3 The basic components of the geometry of hyperbolas.

The eccentricity of a hyperbola is a value that describes the hyperbola's shape. It can be calculated by dividing the focal distance by the length of the semi-major axis, which per Figure 2 is SO/OA. As can be seen in Figure 3, the eccentricity is also equal to $\sec\Phi$, where $\Phi$ is the angle between the major axis and the asymptote. Therefore:

$$\frac{\text{SO}}{\text{OA}} = \sec\Phi$$

As can be deduced from Figure 2, the focal distance SO is

$$\text{SO} = b \csc\Phi$$

and therefore

$$\text{OA} = \frac{\text{SO}}{\sec\Phi} = b \cot\Phi$$

With these formulas for SO and OA, the distance $r_\text{A}$ can be written in terms of $\Phi$ and simplified using a trigonometric identity known as a half-angle formula:

$$r_\text{A} = \text{SO} + \text{OA}$$

$$= b \csc\Phi + b \cot\Phi$$

$$= b \cot\frac{\Phi}{2}$$

Applying a trigonometric identity known as the cotangent double angle formula and the previous equation for $r_\text{A}$ gives a simpler relationship between the physical and geometric variables:

$$r_\text{min} = r_\text{A} - \frac{b^2}{r_\text{A}}$$

$$= b\cot\frac{\Phi}{2} - \frac{b^2}{b\cot\frac{\Phi}{2}}$$

$$= b \frac{\cot^2\frac{\Phi}{2} - 1}{\cot\frac{\Phi}{2}}$$

$$= 2 b \cot \Phi$$

The scattering angle of the particle is $\theta = \pi - 2 \Phi$ and therefore $\Phi = \tfrac{\pi - \theta}{2}$. With the help of a trigonometric identity known as a reflection formula, the relationship between θ and b can be resolved to:

$$r_\text{min} = 2b\cot \frac{\pi - \theta}{2}$$

$$= 2b\tan \frac{\theta}{2}$$

$$\cot\frac{\theta}{2} = \frac{2b}{r_\text{min}}$$

which can be rearranged to give

$$\theta = 2 \arctan \frac{r_\text{min}}{2b} = 2 \arctan \frac{k q_\text{a} q_\text{g}}{m v_0^2 b}$$

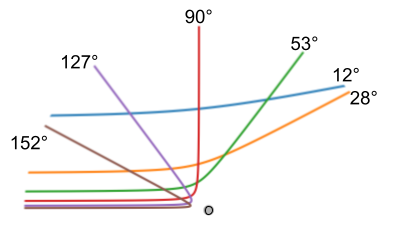
Hyperbolic trajectories of alpha particles scattering from a Gold nucleus (modern radius shown as gray circle) as described in Rutherford's 1911 paper

Rutherford gives some illustrative values as shown in this table:

Rutherford's angle of deviation table
| $\tfrac{b}{r_\text{min}}$ | 10 | 5 | 2 | 1 | 0.5 | 0.25 | 0.125 |
| $\theta$ | 5.7° | 11.4° | 28° | 53° | 90° | 127° | 152° |

Rutherford's approach to this scattering problem remains a standard treatment in textbooks on classical mechanics.

=== Intensity vs angle ===
Geometry of differential scattering cross-section

To compare to experiments the relationship between impact parameter and scattering angle needs to be converted to probability versus angle. The scattering cross section gives the relative intensity by angles:
$$\frac{\mathrm{d} \sigma}{\mathrm{d} \Omega}(\Omega) \mathrm{d} \Omega = \frac{\text{number of particles scattered into solid angle } \mathrm{d} \Omega \text{ per unit time}}{\text{incident intensity}}$$

In classical mechanics, the scattering angle $\theta$ is uniquely determined the initial kinetic energy of the incoming particles and the impact parameter b. Therefore, the number of particles scattered into an angle between $\theta$ and $\theta + \mathrm{d}\theta$ must be the same as the number of particles with associated impact parameters between b and b + db. For an incident intensity I, this implies:

$$2\pi I b \cdot \left|\mathrm{d}b\right| =-2 \pi \cdot \sigma (\theta) \cdot I \cdot \sin(\theta) \cdot \mathrm{d}\theta$$

Thus the cross section depends on scattering angle as:

$$\sigma (\theta) = - \frac{b}{\sin\theta} \cdot \frac{\mathrm{d}b}{\mathrm{d}\theta}$$

Using the impact parameter as a function of angle, b(θ), from the single scattering result above produces the Rutherford scattering cross section:

$$s = \frac {Xnt\cdot \csc^4{\frac{\phi}{2}}}{16r^2} \cdot {\left(\frac {2 k q_\text{n} q_\text{a}}{mv^2}\right)}^2$$

- s = the number of alpha particles falling on unit area at an angle of deflection ɸ
- r = distance from point of incidence of α rays on scattering material
- X = total number of particles falling on the scattering material
- n = number of atoms in a unit volume of the material
- t = thickness of the foil
- q_{n} = positive charge of the atomic nucleus
- q_{a} = positive charge of the alpha particles
- m = mass of an alpha particle
- v = velocity of the alpha particle

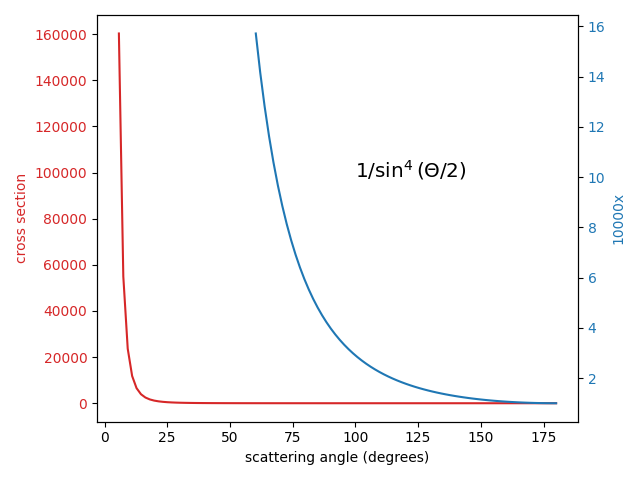
Rutherford scattering cross-section is strongly peaked around zero degrees, and yet has nonzero values out to 180 degrees.

This formula predicted the results that Geiger measured in the coming year. The scattering probability into small angles greatly exceeds the probability in to larger angles, reflecting the tiny nucleus surrounded by empty space. However, for rare close encounters, large angle scattering occurs with just a single target.

At the end of his development of the cross section formula, Rutherford emphasises that the results apply to single scattering and thus require measurements with thin foils. For thin foils the degree of scattering is proportional to the foil thickness in agreement with Geiger's measurements.

=== Comparison to JJ Thomson's results ===
At the time of Rutherford's paper, JJ Thomson was the "undisputed world master in the design of atoms". Rutherford needed to compare his new approach to Thomson's. Thomson's model, presented in 1910, modelled the electron collisions with hyperbolic orbits from his 1906 paper combined with a factor for the positive sphere. Multiple resulting small deflections compounded using a random walk.

In his paper Rutherford emphasised that single scattering alone could account for Thomson's results if the positive charge were concentrated in the centre. Rutherford computes the probability of single scattering from a compact charge and demonstrates that it is 3 times larger than Thomson's multiple scattering probability. Rutherford completes his analysis including the effects of density and foil thickness, then concludes that thin foils are governed by single scattering, not multiple scattering.

Later analysis showed Thomson's scattering model could not account for large scattering. The maximum angular deflection from electron scattering or from the positive sphere each come to less than 0.02°; even many such scattering events compounded would result in less than a one degree average deflection and a probability of scattering through 90° of less than one in 10^{3500}.

=== Target recoil ===
Rutherford's analysis assumed that alpha particle trajectories turned at the centre of the atom but the exit velocity was not reduced. This is equivalent to assuming that the concentrated charge at the centre had infinite mass or was anchored in place. Rutherford discusses the limitations of this assumption by comparing scattering from lighter atoms like aluminium with heavier atoms like gold. If the concentrated charge is lighter it will recoil from the interaction, gaining momentum while the alpha particle loses momentum and consequently slows down.

Modern treatments analyze this type of Coulomb scattering in the centre of mass reference frame. The six coordinates of the two particles (also called "bodies") are converted into three relative coordinates between the two particles and three centre-of-mass coordinates moving in space (called the lab frame). The interaction only occurs in the relative coordinates, giving an equivalent one-body problem just as Rutherford solved, but with different interpretations for the mass and scattering angle.

Rather than the mass of the alpha particle, the more accurate formula including recoil uses reduced mass:

$$\mu = \cfrac{m_1 m_2}{m_1 + m_2}.$$

For Rutherford's alpha particle scattering from gold, with mass of 197, the reduced mass is very close to the mass of the alpha particle:

$$\mu_\text{Au} = \cfrac{4\times 197}{4 + 197} = 3.92 \approx 4$$

For lighter aluminium, with mass 27, the effect is greater:

$$\mu_\text{Al} = \cfrac{4\times 27}{4 + 27} = 3.48$$

a 13% difference in mass. Rutherford notes this difference and suggests experiments be performed with lighter atoms.

The second effect is a change in scattering angle. The angle in the relative coordinate system or centre of mass frame needs to be converted to an angle in the lab frame. In the lab frame, denoted by a subscript L, the scattering angle for a general central potential is

$$\tan \Theta_\text{L} = \frac{\sin\Theta}{\cos\Theta + \frac{m_1}{m_2}}$$

For a heavy particle like gold used by Rutherford, the factor $\tfrac{m_1}{m_2} = \tfrac{4}{197} \approx 0.02$ can be neglected at almost all angles. Then the lab and relative angles are the same, $\Theta_\text{L} \approx \Theta$.

The change in scattering angle alters the formula for differential cross-section needed for comparison to experiment. In general the calculation is complex. For the case of alpha-particle scattering from gold atoms, this effect on the cross section is quite small.

== Limitations to Rutherford's scattering formula ==
=== Very light nuclei and higher energies ===
In 1919 Rutherford analyzed alpha particle scattering from hydrogen atoms, showing the limits of the 1911 formula even with corrections for reduced mass. Similar issues with smaller deviations for helium, magnesium, aluminium led to the conclusion that the alpha particle was penetrating the nucleus in these cases. This allowed the first estimates of the size of atomic nuclei. Later experiments based on cyclotron acceleration of alpha particles striking heavier nuclei provided data for analysis of interaction between the alpha particle and the nuclear surface. However at energies that push the alpha particles deeper they are strongly absorbed by the nuclei, a more complex interaction.

=== Quantum mechanics ===
Rutherford's treatment of alpha particle scattering rely on classical mechanics and yet the particles are of sub-atomic dimensions and are best described using quantum mechanics. The critical aspects of the theory ultimately rely on conservation of momentum and energy. These concepts apply equally in classical and quantum regimes for single scattering: the scattering ideas developed by Rutherford apply to subatomic elastic scattering problems like neutron-proton scattering.However, for both electron diffraction and matter waves a full quantum mechanical approach is often needed, including phenomena such as preservation of crystal momentum as a generalisation of momentum conservation. A key question is the coherence of the scattering process. For instance, for high-angle annular dark-field imaging the scattering is dominated by the time average of incoherent phonons, so the classical Rutherford equations are often used.

== Force based alpha particle scattering ==
This section presents an alternative method to find the relation between the impact parameter and deflection angle in a single-atom encounter, using a force-centric approach as opposed to the energy-centric one that Rutherford used.

The scattering geometry is shown in this diagram

The impact parameter b is the distance between the alpha particle's initial trajectory and a parallel line that goes through the nucleus. Smaller values of b bring the particle closer to the atom so it feels more deflection force resulting in a larger deflection angle θ. The goal is to find the relationship between b and the deflection angle.

The alpha particle's path is a hyperbola and the net change in momentum $\Delta\vec{P}$ runs along the axis of symmetry. From the geometry in the diagram and the magnitude of the initial and final momentum vectors, $|\vec{P}_\text{i}| = |\vec{P}_\text{f}| = mv$, the magnitude of $\Delta\vec{P}$ can be related to the deflection angle:

$$\Delta P = 2mv \cdot \sin\frac{\theta}{2}$$

A second formula for $\Delta P$ involving b will give the relationship to the deflection angle. The net change in momentum can also be found by adding small increments to momentum all along the trajectory using the integral

$$\Delta P = \int\limits_{0} ^ {\infty} \frac{kq_\text{a} q_\text{g}}{r^2} \cdot \cos\varphi \cdot\mathrm  \mathrm dt$$

where $r$ is the distance between the alpha particle and the centre of the nucleus and $\varphi$ is its angle from the axis of symmetry. These two are the polar coordinates of the alpha particle at time $t$. q_{a} is the charge of the alpha particle, q_{g} is the charge of the atomic nucleus, and k is the Coulomb constant. The Coulomb force exerted along the line between the alpha particle and the atom is $\tfrac{kq_\text{a} q_\text{g}}{r^2}$and the factor $\cos\varphi$ gives that part of the force causing deflection.

The polar coordinates r and φ depend on t in the integral, but they must be related to each other as they both vary as the particle moves. Changing the variable and limits of integration from t to φ makes this connection explicit:

$$\Delta P = \int\limits_{-\frac{\pi - \theta}{2}} ^ {\frac{\pi - \theta}{2}} \frac{kq_\text{a} q_\text{g}}{r^2} \cdot \cos\varphi \cdot \frac{\mathrm dt}{\mathrm d\varphi} \cdot \mathrm d\varphi$$

The factor $\tfrac{\mathrm dt}{\mathrm d\varphi} = \tfrac{1}{\omega}$ is the reciprocal of the angular velocity the particle. Since the force is only along the line between the particle and the atom, the angular momentum, which is proportional to the angular velocity, is constant:

$$mvb = mr^2 \omega = mr^2\frac{\mathrm d\varphi}{\mathrm dt}$$

This law of conservation of angular momentum gives a formula for $\tfrac{\mathrm dt}{\mathrm d\varphi}$:

$$\frac{\mathrm dt}{\mathrm d\varphi} =  \frac{r^2}{vb}$$

Replacing $\tfrac{\mathrm dt}{\mathrm d\varphi}$ in the integral for ΔP simultaneously eliminates the dependence on r:

$$\Delta P = \int\limits_{-\frac{\pi - \theta}{2}} ^ {\frac{\pi - \theta}{2}} \frac{kq_\text{a} q_\text{g}}{vb} \cdot \cos\varphi \cdot \mathrm d\varphi$$

$$= \frac{kq_\text{a} q_\text{g}}{vb} \left ( \sin\left[\frac{\pi - \theta}{2}\right] - \sin\left[-\frac{\pi - \theta}{2}\right] \right )$$

Applying the trigonometric identities $\sin(\tfrac{\pi}{2} - \theta) = \cos\theta$ and $\sin(\theta \pm \tfrac{\pi}{2}) = \pm\cos\theta$ to simplify this result gives the second formula for $\Delta P$:

$$\Delta P = \frac{kq_\text{a} q_\text{g}}{vb} \cdot 2\cos{\frac{\theta}{2}}$$

We now have two equations for $\Delta P$, which we can solve for θ:

$$\Delta P = \frac{kq_\text{a} q_\text{g}}{vb} \cdot 2\cos{\frac{\theta}{2}} = 2mv\cdot\sin\frac{\theta}{2}$$

$$\theta = 2\arctan \frac{kq_\text{a} q_\text{g}}{mv^2b}$$

Using the following values, we will examine an example where an alpha particle passes through a gold atom:

- q_{g} = positive charge of the gold atom = 79 q_{e} = 1.26×10^{−17} C
- q_{a} = charge of the alpha particle = 2 q_{e} = 3.20×10^{−19} C
- v = speed of the alpha particle = 1.53×10^{7} m/s
- m = mass of the alpha particle = 6.64×10^{−27} kg
- k = Coulomb constant = 8.987×10^{9} N·m^{2}/C^{2}

When the alpha particle passes close to the nucleus barely missing it, such that the impact parameter b is equal to the radius of a gold nucleus (7×10^{−15} m), the estimated deflection angle θ will be 2.56 radians (147°). If the alpha particle grazes the edge of the atom, with b therefore being equal to 1.44×10^{−10} m, the estimated deflection is a tiny 0.0003 radians (0.02°).

== Scattering by a uniform sphere ==
Central to the impact of Rutherford's 1911 paper was the observation that the backscattering observed by Geiger and Marsden means the atomic charge must be concentrated in a tiny volume. Using the Coulomb scattering formula for an atom sized sphere as proposed for Thomson's plum pudding model makes this clear. Thomson himself didn't study alpha particle scattering, but he did study beta particle scattering. The theory in his 1910 paper "On the Scattering of rapidly moving Electrified Particles" can be adapted to alpha particle scattering.

The other important area of application for scattering from a uniform sphere occurs in high energy electrons scattering from atomic nuclei. When the energy is high enough for the electron to penetrate the nucleus, the first approximation treats the nucleus as a uniform sphere and the angular distribution deviates from the one found by Rutherford. However in these cases electron spin effects must be considered as well.

=== Deflection by the positive sphere ===
Consider an alpha particle passing by a sphere of pure positive charge (no electrons) with a radius R. The sphere is so much heavier than the alpha particle that we do not account for recoil. Its position is fixed. The alpha particle passes just close enough to graze the edge of the sphere, which is where the electric field of the sphere is strongest.

Figure 4

An earlier section of this article presented an equation which models how an incoming charged particle is deflected by another charged particle at a fixed position (ie infinite mass).

$$\theta = 2 \arctan {\frac{k q_1 q_2}{m v^2 b}}$$

This equation can be used to calculate the deflection angle in the special case in Figure 4 by setting the impact parameter b to the same value as the radius of the sphere R. So long as the alpha particle does not penetrate the sphere, there is no difference between a sphere of charge and a point charge.

- q_{g} = positive charge of the gold atom = 79 q_{e} = 1.26×10^{−17} C
- q_{a} = charge of the alpha particle = 2 q_{e} = 3.20×10^{−19} C
- R = radius of the gold atom = 1.44×10^{−10} m
- v = speed of the alpha particle = 1.53×10^{7} m/s
- m = mass of the alpha particle = 6.64×10^{−27} kg
- k = Coulomb constant = 8.987×10^{9} N·m^{2}/C^{2}

Using:
$$\theta_2 = 2 \arctan {\frac{k q_\text{a} q_\text{g}}{m v^2 R}} \approx 0.02  \text{ degrees}$$

This shows that the largest possible deflection will be very small, to the point that the path of the alpha particle passing through the positive sphere of a gold atom is almost a straight line. Therefore in computing the average deflection, which will be smaller still, we will treat the particle's path through the sphere as a chord of length L.

Figure 5

Inside a sphere of uniformly distributed positive charge, the force exerted on the alpha particle at any point along its path through the sphere is

$$F = \frac{k q_\text{a} q_\text{g}}{r^2} \cdot \frac{r^3}{R^3}$$

The lateral component of this force is

$$F_\text{y} = \frac{k q_\text{a} q_\text{g}}{r^2} \cdot \frac{r^3}{R^3} \cdot \cos\varphi = \frac{b k q_\text{a} q_\text{g}}{R^3}$$

The lateral change in momentum p_{y} is therefore

$$\Delta p_\text{y} = F_\text{y} t =\frac{b k q_\text{a} q_\text{g}}{R^3} \cdot \frac{L}{v}$$

The deflection angle $\theta_2$ is given by

$$\tan\theta_2 = \frac{\Delta p_\text{y}}{p_\text{x}} = \frac{b k q_\text{a} q_\text{g}}{R^3} \cdot \frac{L}{v} \cdot \frac{1}{mv}$$

where p_{x} is the average horizontal momentum, which is first reduced then restored as horizontal force changes direction as the alpha particle goes across the sphere. Since the deflection is very small, $\tan\theta_2$ can be treated as equal to $\theta_2$. The chord length $L = 2 \sqrt{R^2 - b^2}$, per Pythagorean theorem.

The average deflection angle $\bar\theta_2$ sums the angle for values of b and L across the entire sphere and divides by the cross-section of the sphere:

$$\bar\theta_2 = \frac{1}{\pi R^2} \int_0^R \frac{b k q_\text{a} q_\text{g}}{R^3} \cdot \frac{2\sqrt{R^2 - b^2}}{v} \cdot \frac{1}{mv} \cdot 2\pi b \cdot \mathrm{d}b$$

$$= \frac{\pi}{4} \cdot \frac{k q_\text{a} q_\text{g}}{mv^2R}$$

This matches Thomson's formula in his 1910 paper.

=== Deflection by the electrons ===
Consider an alpha particle passing through an atom of radius R along a path of length L. The effect of the positive sphere is ignored so as to isolate the effect of the atomic electrons. As with the positive sphere, deflection by the electrons is expected to be very small, to the point that the path is practically a straight line.

Figure 6

For the electrons within an arbitrary distance s of the alpha particle's path, their mean distance will be 1/2s. Therefore, the average deflection per electron will be

$$2 \arctan \frac{k q_\text{a} q_\text{e}}{mv^2 \tfrac{1}{2}s} \approx \frac{4k q_\text{a} q_\text{e}}{mv^2 s}$$

where q_{e} is the elementary charge. The average net deflection by all the electrons within this arbitrary cylinder of effect around the alpha particle's path is

$$\theta_1 = \frac{4k q_\text{a} q_\text{e}}{mv^2 s} \sqrt{N_0 \pi s^2 L}$$

where N_{0} is the number of electrons per unit volume and $\pi s^2 L$ is the volume of this cylinder.

Figure 7

Treating L as a straight line, $L = 2\sqrt{R^2 - b^2}$ where b is the distance of this line from the centre. The mean of $\sqrt{L}$ is therefore

$$\frac{1}{\pi R^2} \int_0^R \sqrt{2 \sqrt{R^2 - b^2}} \cdot 2\pi b \cdot \mathrm{d}b = \frac{4}{5} \sqrt{2R}$$

To obtain the mean deflection $\bar{\theta}_1$, replace $\sqrt{L}$ in the equation for $\theta_1$:

$$\bar{\theta}_1 = \frac{4k q_\text{a} q_\text{e}}{mv^2 s} \sqrt{N_0 \pi s^2} \cdot \frac{4}{5} \sqrt{2R}$$

$$= \frac{16}{5} \cdot \frac{k q_\text{a} q_\text{e}}{m v^2 R} \sqrt{\frac{3N}{2}}$$

where N is the number of electrons in the atom, equal to $N_0 \tfrac{4}{3} \pi R^3$.

=== Combined deflection ===
The average partial deflection caused by the atomic electrons on an incoming beta particle is

$$\bar\theta_1 = \frac{16}{5} \cdot \frac{k q_\text{e} q_\text{e}}{m v^2 R} \sqrt{\frac{3N}{2}}$$

and the average partial deflection caused by the positive sphere is

$$\bar\theta_2 = \frac{\pi}{4} \cdot \frac{k q_\text{e} q_\text{g}}{m v^2 R}$$

where q_{e} is the elementary charge, q_{g} is the positive charge of the atom, m and v are the mass and velocity of the incoming particle, N is the number of electrons in the atom, and R is the radius of the atom.

The net deflection is given by

$$\bar\theta = \sqrt{\bar\theta_1^2 + \bar\theta_2^2}$$

=== Cumulative effect ===
Applying Thomson's equations described above to an alpha particle colliding with a gold atom, using the following values:

- q_{g} = positive charge of the gold atom = 79 q_{e} = 1.26×10^{−17} C
- q_{a} = charge of the alpha particle = 2 q_{e} = 3.20×10^{−19} C
- q_{e} = elementary charge = 1.602×10^{−19} C
- R = radius of the gold atom = 1.44×10^{−10} m
- v = speed of the alpha particle = 1.53×10^{7} m/s
- m = mass of the alpha particle = 6.64×10^{−27} kg
- k = Coulomb constant = 8.987×10^{9} N·m^{2}/C^{2}
- N = number of electrons in the gold atom = 79

gives the average partial angle by which the alpha particle should be deflected by the atomic electrons as:

$$\bar\theta_1 = \frac{16}{5} \cdot \frac{k q_\text{a} q_\text{e}}{mv^2 R} \sqrt{\frac{3N}{2}} \approx 0.00007 \text{ radians or } 0.004 \text{ degrees}$$

and the average partial deflection caused by the positive sphere is:

$$\bar\theta_2 = \frac{\pi}{4} \cdot \frac{k q_\text{a} q_\text{g}}{mv^2 R} \approx 0.00013 \text{ radians or 0.007 degrees}$$

The net deflection for a single atomic collision is:

$$\bar\theta = \sqrt{\bar\theta_1^2 + \bar\theta_2^2} \approx 0.008 \text{ degrees}$$

On average the positive sphere and the electrons alike provide very little deflection in a single collision. Thomson's model combined many single-scattering events from the atom's electrons and a positive sphere. Each collision may increase or decrease the total scattering angle. Only very rarely would a series of collisions all line up in the same direction. The result is similar to the standard statistical problem called a random walk. If the average deflection angle of the alpha particle in a single collision with an atom is $\bar{\theta}$, then the average deflection after n collisions is

$$\bar\theta_n = \bar{\theta}\sqrt{n}$$

The probability that an alpha particle will be deflected by a total of more than 90° after n deflections is given by:

$$e^{-(90 / \bar\theta_n)^2}$$

where e is Euler's number (≈2.71828...). A gold foil with a thickness of 1.5 micrometers would be about 10,000 atoms thick. If the average deflection per atom is 0.008°, the average deflection after 10,000 collisions would be 0.8°. The probability of an alpha particle being deflected by more than 90° will be

$$e^{-(90 / 0.8)^2} \approx e^{-12656} \approx 10^{-5946}$$

While in Thomson's plum pudding model it is mathematically possible that an alpha particle could be deflected by more than 90° after 10,000 collisions, the probability of such an event is so low as to be undetectable. Geiger and Marsden should not have detected any alpha particles coming back in the experiment they performed in 1909, and yet they did.

== Quantum model ==
Coulomb scattering in quantum mechanics begins with a physical model based on the Schrodinger wave equation for probability amplitude $\psi$:
$$-\frac{\hbar^2}{2\mu}\nabla^2\psi + V\psi = E\psi$$
where $\mu$ is the reduced mass of two scattering particles and E is the energy of relative motion. For scattering problems, a stationary (time-independent) wavefunction is sought with an asymptotic form in two parts. First a plane wave represents the incoming source and, second, a spherical wave emanating from the scattering center placed at the coordinate origin represents the scattered wave:
$$\psi(r\rightarrow \infty) \sim e^{i\mathbf{k}_i\cdot\mathbf{r}} + f(\mathbf{k}_f,\mathbf{k}_i)\frac{e^{i\mathbf{k}_f\cdot\mathbf{r}}}{r}$$
The scattering amplitude, $f(\mathbf{k}_f,\mathbf{k}_i)$, represents the amplitude that the target will scatter into the direction $\mathbf{k}_f$.

In general the scattering amplitude requires knowing the full scattering wavefunction:
$$f(\mathbf{k}_f,\mathbf{k}_i) = -\frac{\mu}{2\pi\hbar^2}\int \psi_f^* V(\mathbf{r}) \psi_i d^3r$$
For weak interactions a perturbation series can be applied; the lowest order is called the Born approximation.

=== Pure or bare-charge case ===
An isolated point charge creates an electric field that extends to infinity, scattering particles no matter how distant. Consequently mathematical analysis of pure Coulomb scattering has challenges. For examples, the forward scattering amplitude is infinite and the asymptotic radial wavefunction never approaches the free particle wavefunction. These mathematical issues can be solved by applying parabolic coordinates leading to solutions in terms of confluent hypergeometric functions. The broadly applied workaround for the divergence of the Born perturbation series is to apply a convergence or screening factor. Experimentally scattering from bare charges is anyway very difficult because there are always neutralizing charges around.

=== Screened Coulomb potential ===
The screened Coulomb potential,
$$V(r) = -\frac{Ze^2}{r}e^{-r/a},$$
can be use as a convergence tool or as a model scattering of a charged particle, like an electron at radius r, from a neutral atom at the origin. Here the electron charge is e and atomic number is Z. The constant a is comparable to the atomic radius. Near the nucleus, with charge Ze, the value of r will be much smaller than the atomic radius, $r\ll a$, making the exponential term close to 1.0. In that region this screened potential matches a Coulomb potential; for $r\gg a$ the potential goes to zero avoiding the divergence.

Using the spherically-symmetric screened potential in the Born approximation gives an integral known as the Laplace transform of $\sin(qr)$:
$$f(\theta) =-\frac{2\mu}{\hbar^2q}\int_0^\infty r \sin(qr) e^{-r/a} dr$$
$$f(\theta) =\frac{2\mu Z e^2}{\hbar^2(q^2+a^{-2})}, \ q=2k \sin (\theta/2)$$
As long as the momentum transfer measured by q is large compared to $1/a$, equivalent to a classical particle passing close to the potential, the cross-section will agree with Rutherford's result:
$$|f(\theta)|^2 \propto \frac{1}{\sin^4(\theta/2)}.$$
The approximation will fail for slow electrons scattering from atoms and is not accurate for relativistic energies of collision.

== Types ==
Coulomb scattering includes all forms of elastic charged particle scattering, meaning an interaction governed by the electromagnetic force with no change in the internal state of the two particles.

=== Rutherford scattering ===
When the two particles are both nuclei, Coulomb scattering is called Rutherford scattering in honor of Ernest Rutherford's role in developing and applying the concept.

=== Mott scattering ===
In nuclear physics, when one of the particles is a high-energy electron, Coulomb scattering is called Mott scattering. Because the electron has no internal components it is especially useful for high energy collisions designed to probe the interior of nuclei. However, Rutherford's model for scattering no longer works for these cases: electron spin, relativistic effects, and the internal structure of the target nucleus must also be considered.

=== Electron diffraction ===
Coulomb scattering involving electrons with energies in the range 1 keV to 1 MeV lead to a variety of different effects depending on the energy and coherence of the electron beam, the character of the solid, and the scattering geometry. (At these energies scattering by the internal arrangement of the nucleus is negligible, and it can be treated as a point charge.) This is called electron diffraction, and the results are dominated by the arrangement of the scattering atoms in the solid, plus, at the lowest energies, the electronic structure of the solid, and require consideration of multiple scattering.

=== Møller scattering and Bhabha scattering ===
Very high energy electron-electron Coulomb scattering (in the TeV energy range) is called Møller scattering; electron-positron scattering is called Bhabha scattering. These are used in experiments that test quantum electrodynamics.

=== Molière multiple elastic scattering ===
Any of the elastic Coulomb scattering types in a dense material can result in multiple scattering events. For high energy particles, a series of incoherent forward Coulomb scattering events is called Molière scattering after Gert Molière who did the initial work in the 1940s. A detailed theory for this small-angle scattering was developed in the 1950s, again with a major contribution from Molière. The treatment assumes each event is statistically independent or quantum mechanically incoherent. (With coherent sources matter wave interference and diffraction effects need to be included.)

== See also ==
- Atomic theory
- Rutherford backscattering spectroscopy
- List of scattering experiments

== Bibliography ==
- "Rutherford's Nuclear World: The Story of the Discovery of the Nucleus". American Institute of Physics.
- "Rutherford scattering". HyperPhysics. Georgia State University.
- Arthur Beiser (1969). Perspectives of Modern Physics. McGraw-Hill Book Company.
- Arthur Stewart Eve (1939). Rutherford: Being the Life and Letters of the Rt. Hon. Lord Rutherford, O. M. MacMillan.
- Ernest Rutherford (1899). "Uranium Radiation and the Electrical conduction Produced by it". Philosophical Magazine. 47 (284): 109–163.
- Ernest Rutherford (1911). "The Scattering of α and β Particles by Matter and the Structure of the Atom" (PDF). Philosophical Magazine. Series 6. 21 (125): 669–688. doi:10.1080/14786440508637080.
- Ernest Rutherford (1906). "The Mass and Velocity of the α particles expelled from Radium and Actinium". Philosophical Magazine. Series 6. 12 (70): 348–371. doi:10.1080/14786440609463549.
- Ernest Rutherford (1912). "The origin of β and γ rays from radioactive substances". Philosophical Magazine. Series 6. 24 (142): 453–462. doi:10.1080/14786441008637351.
- Ernest Rutherford; John Mitchell Nuttal (1913). "Scattering of α-Particles by Gases". Philosophical Magazine. Series 6. 26 (154): 702–712. doi:10.1080/14786441308635014.
- Ernest Rutherford (1914). "The Structure of the Atom". Philosophical Magazine. Series 6. 27 (159): 488–498. doi:10.1080/14786440308635117.
- Ernest Rutherford (1938). "Forty Years of Physics". In Needham, Joseph; Pagel, Walter (eds.). Background to Modern Science: Ten Lectures at Cambridge arranged by the History of Science Committee 1936. Cambridge University Press.
- Ernest Rutherford (1913). Radioactive Substances and their Radiations. Cambridge University Press.
- Ernest Rutherford (1936). "Radioactivity and Atomic Structure". Journal of the Chemical Society. 1936: 508–516. doi:10.1039/JR9360000508.
- John L. Heilbron (January 1968). "The Scattering of α and β Particles and Rutherford's Atom". Archive for History of Exact Sciences. 4 (4): 247–307. doi:10.1007/BF00411591.
- John L. Heilbron (2003). Ernest Rutherford and the Explosion of Atoms. Oxford University Press. ISBN 978-0-19-512378-4.
- Joy Manners (2000). Quantum Physics: An Introduction. CRC Press. ISBN 978-0-7503-0720-8.
- Hantaro Nagaoka (1904). "Kinetics of a System of Particles illustrating the Line and the Band Spectrum and the Phenomena of Radioactivity". Philosophical Magazine. Series 6. 7 (41): 445–455. doi:10.1080/14786440409463141.
- Richard Reeves (2008). A Force of Nature: The Frontier Genius of Ernest Rutherford. W. W. Norton & Co. ISBN 978-0-393-07604-2.
- J. J. Thomson (1910). "On the Scattering of rapidly moving Electrified Particles". Proceedings of the Cambridge Philosophical Society. 15: 465–471.
- Goldstein, Herbert; Poole, Charles; Safko, John (2002). Classical Mechanics (third ed.). Addison-Wesley. ISBN 978-0-201-65702-9.
- Tong, David. "Lectures on Dynamics and Relativity". University of Cambridge. Chapter 4 Central forces
