= T channel =

T channel may refer to:

- Mandelstam variables
- T-type calcium channel
