= Sherman function =

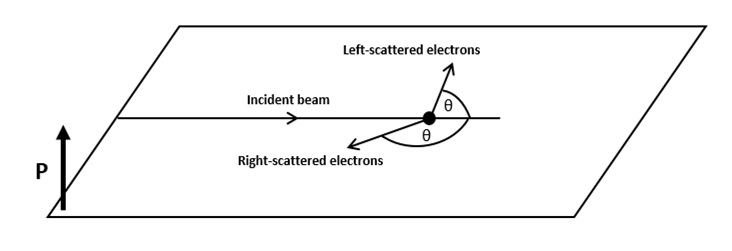
Schematic view of Mott scattering. An incident electron beam collides with the target and the electrons scattered to the left and to the right at a specific angle θ are detected

The Sherman function describes the dependence of electron-atom scattering events on the spin of the scattered electrons. It was first evaluated theoretically by the physicist Noah Sherman and it allows the measurement of polarization of an electron beam by Mott scattering experiments. A correct evaluation of the Sherman function associated to a particular experimental setup is of vital importance in experiments of spin polarized photoemission spectroscopy, which is an experimental technique which allows to obtain information about the magnetic behaviour of a sample.

== Background ==
=== Polarization and spin-orbit coupling ===
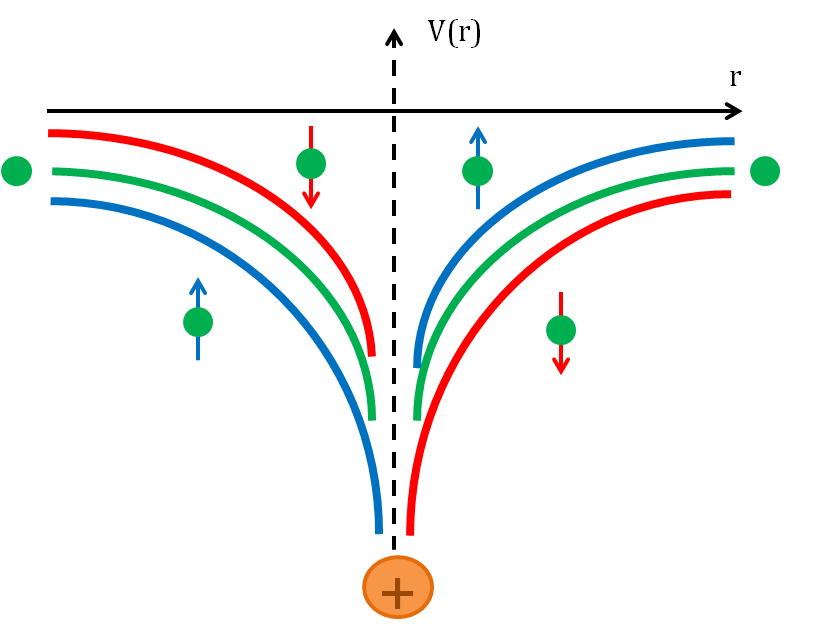
Correction to Coulomb potential due to spin-orbit coupling. The Coulomb potential, result of the interaction of the electron with the charged nucleus is shown in green. The new potential for spin up (blue) and spin down (red) electrons are shown after spin-orbit correctios have been taken into account

When an electron beam is polarized, an unbalance between spin-up, $n_{up}$, and spin-down electrons, $n_{down}$, exists. The unbalance can be evaluated through the polarization $P$ defined as

$$P = \frac{n_{up}-n_{down}}{n_{up}+n_{down}}$$.

It is known that, when an electron collides against a nucleus, the scattering event is governed by Coulomb interaction. This is the leading term in the Hamiltonian, but a correction due to spin-orbit coupling can be taken into account and the effect on the Hamiltonian can be evaluated with the perturbation theory. Spin orbit interaction can be evaluated, in the rest reference frame of the electron, as the result of the interaction of the spin magnetic moment of the electron

$$\boldsymbol{\mu}_S = -g_\text{s} \mu_\text{B} \frac{\mathbf{S}}{\hbar},$$

with the magnetic field that the electron sees, due to its orbital motion around the nucleus, whose expression in the non-relativistic limit is:

$$\mathbf{B} = \frac{1}{m_\text{e} ec^2} \frac{1}{r} \frac{\partial U(r)}{\partial r} \mathbf{L}.$$

In these expressions $\mathbf{S}$ is the spin angular-momentum, $\mu_\text{B}$ is the Bohr magneton, $g_\text{s}$ is the g-factor, $\hbar$ is the reduced Planck constant, $m_\text{e}$ is the electron mass, $e$ is the elementary charge, $c$ is the speed of light, $U = eV$ is the potential energy of the electron and $\mathbf{L} = \mathbf{r} \times \mathbf{p}$ is the angular momentum.

Due to spin orbit coupling, a new term will appear in the Hamiltonian, whose expression is

$$V_\text{SO} = -\boldsymbol{\mu_s}\cdot\mathbf{B}$$.

Due to this effect, electrons will be scattered with different probabilities at different angles. Since the spin-orbit coupling is enhanced when the involved nuclei possess a high atomic number Z, the target is usually made of heavy metals, such as mercury, gold and thorium.

=== Asymmetry ===
If we place two detectors at the same angle from the target, one on the right and one on the left, they will generally measure a different number of electrons $n_{R}$ and $n_{L}$. Consequently it is possible to define the asymmetry $A$, as

$$A = \frac{n_{R}-n_{L}}{n_{R}+n_{L}}$$.

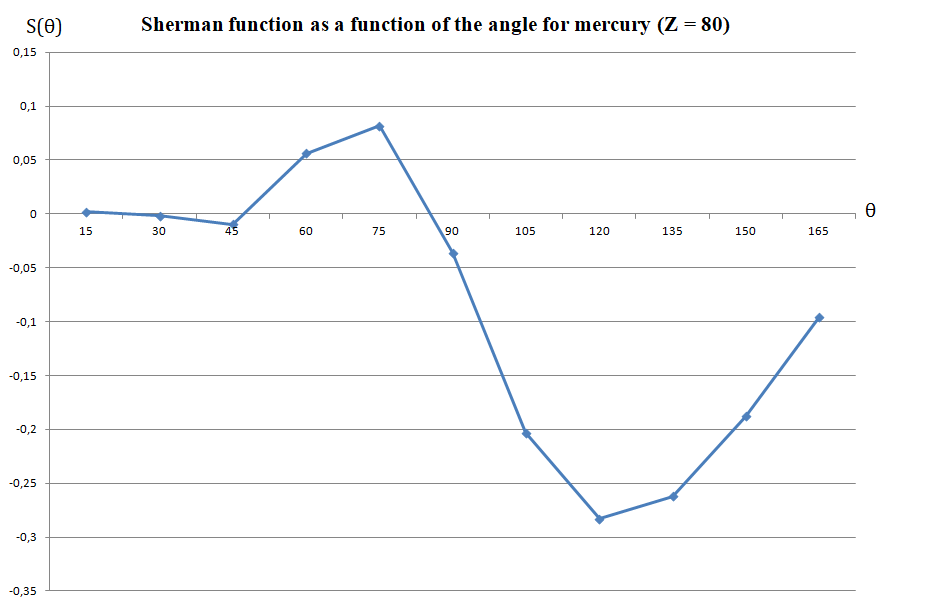
Sherman function as a function of the angle for mercury (Z = 80) with β = 0.2. Typically detectors are placed in a position where the effect is maximized, 120° for gold and mercury

The Sherman function $S(\theta)$ is a measure of the probability of a spin-up electron to be scattered, at a specific angle $\theta$, to the right or to the left of the target, due to spin-orbit coupling. It can assume values ranging from -1 (spin-up electron is scattered with 100% probability to the left of the target) to +1 (spin-up electron is scattered with 100% probability to the right of the target). The value of the Sherman function depends on the energy of the incoming electron, evaluated via the parameter $\beta = \frac{v}{c}$. When $S(\theta)=0$, spin-up electrons will be scattered with the same probability to the right and to the left of the target.

Then it is possible to write

$$n_{R} = \frac{n_{up}[1+S(\theta)]+n_{down}[1-S(\theta)]}{2}$$

$$n_{L} = \frac{n_{up}[1-S(\theta)]+n_{down}[1+S(\theta)]}{2}.$$

Plugging these formulas inside the definition of asymmetry, it is possible to obtain a simple expression for the evaluation of the asymmetry at a specific angle $\theta$, i.e.:

$$A = PS(\theta)$$.

Theoretical calculations are available for different atomic targets and for a specific target, as a function of the angle.

== Application ==
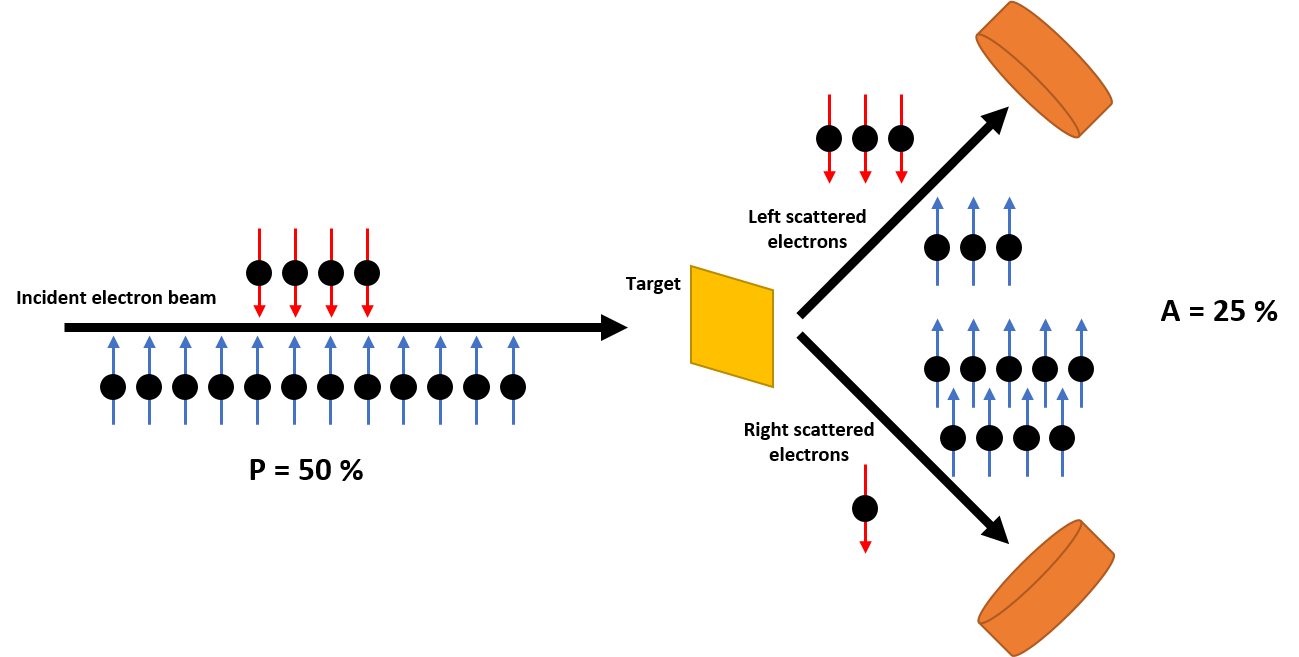
Mott scattering of an electron beam with $S(\theta)=0.5$

To measure the polarization of an electron beam, a Mott detector is required. In order to maximize the spin-orbit coupling, it is necessary that the electrons arrive near to the nuclei of the target. To achieve this condition, a system of electron optics is usually present, in order to accelerate the beam up to keV or to MeV energies. Since standard electron detectors count electrons being insensitive to their spin, after the scattering with the target any information about the original polarization of the beam is lost. Nevertheless, by measuring the difference in the counts of the two detectors, the asymmetry can be evaluated and, if the Sherman function is known from previous calibration, the polarization can be calculated by inverting the last formula.

In order to characterize completely the in-plane polarization, setups are available, with four channeltrons, two devoted to the left-right measure and two devoted to the up-right measure.

=== Example ===
In the panel it is shown an example of the working principle of a Mott detector, supposing a value for $S(\theta)=0.5$. If an electron beam with a 3:1 ratio of spin-up over spin-down electrons collide with the target, it will be split with a ratio 5:3, according to previous equation, with an asymmetry of 25%.

== See also ==
- Spin–orbit interaction
- Mott scattering
- Photoemission spectroscopy
