= Crossing (physics) =

Property of scattering amplitudes

In quantum field theory, a branch of theoretical physics, crossing is the property of scattering amplitudes that allows antiparticles to be interpreted as particles going backwards in time.

Crossing states that the same formula that determines the S-matrix elements and scattering amplitudes for particle $\mathrm{A}$ to scatter with $\mathrm{X}$ and produce particle $\mathrm{B}$ and $\mathrm{Y}$ will also give the scattering amplitude for $\mathrm{A}+\bar{\mathrm{B}}+\mathrm{X}$ to go into $\mathrm{Y}$, or for $\bar{\mathrm{B}}$ to scatter with $\mathrm{X}$ to produce $\mathrm{Y}+\bar{\mathrm{A}}$. The only difference is that the value of the energy is negative for the antiparticle.

The formal way to state this property is that the antiparticle scattering amplitudes are the analytic continuation of particle scattering amplitudes to negative energies. The interpretation of this statement is that the antiparticle is in every way a particle going backwards in time.

== History ==
Murray Gell-Mann and Marvin Leonard Goldberger introduced crossing symmetry in 1954. Crossing had already been implicit in the work of Richard Feynman, but came to its own in the 1950s and 1960s as part of the analytic S-matrix program.

== Overview ==
Consider an amplitude $\mathcal{M}( \phi (p) + ... \ \rightarrow ...)$. We concentrate our attention on one of the incoming particles with momentum p. The quantum field $\phi (p)$, corresponding to the particle is allowed to be either bosonic or fermionic. Crossing symmetry states that we can relate the amplitude of this process to the amplitude of a similar process with an outgoing antiparticle $\bar{\phi} (-p)$ replacing the incoming particle $\phi (p)$: $\mathcal{M}( \phi (p) + ... \rightarrow ...)=\mathcal{M}( ... \rightarrow ... + \bar{\phi} (-p) )$.

In the bosonic case, the idea behind crossing symmetry can be understood intuitively using Feynman diagrams. Consider any process involving an incoming particle with momentum p. For the particle to give a measurable contribution to the amplitude, it has to interact with a number of different particles with momenta $q_{1}, q_{2}, ... , q_{n}$ via a vertex. Conservation of momentum implies $\sum_{k=1}^{n} q_{k}=p$. In case of an outgoing particle, conservation of momentum reads as $\sum_{k=1}^{n}q_{k}=-p$. Thus, replacing an incoming boson with an outgoing antiboson with opposite momentum yields the same S-matrix element.

In fermionic case, one can apply the same argument but now the relative phase convention for the external spinors must be taken into account.

== Examples ==
For example, the annihilation of an electron with a positron into two photons is related to an elastic scattering of an electron with a photon (Compton scattering) by crossing symmetry. This relation allows to calculate the scattering amplitude of one process from the amplitude for the other process if negative values of energy of some particles are substituted.

Bhabha scattering (electron–positron scattering) and Møller scattering (electron-electron scattering) are also related by crossing symmetry.

== See also ==
- Feynman–Stueckelberg interpretation
- Feynman diagram
- Regge theory
- Detailed balance
