= Mott scattering =

Physical interaction of charged particles

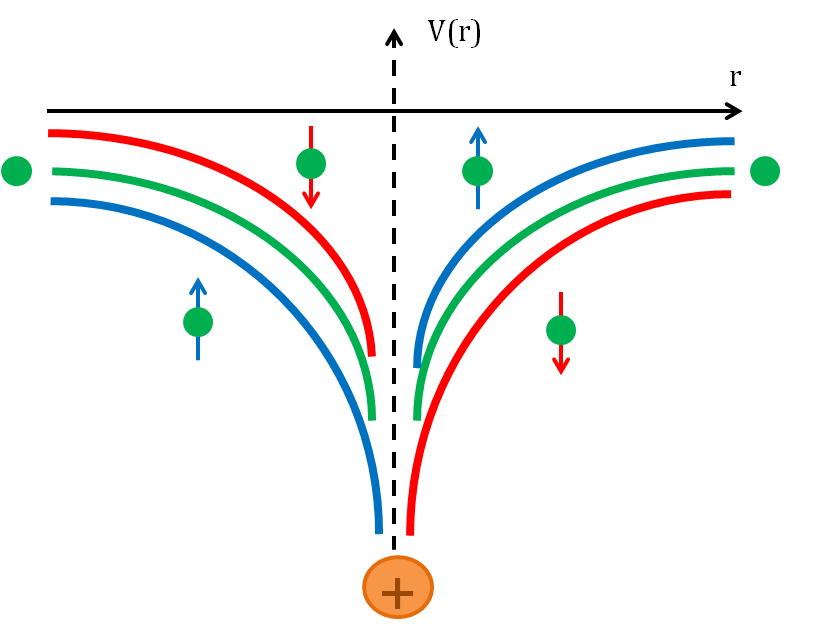
Correction to Coulomb potential due to spin-orbit coupling. The Coulomb potential, result of the interaction of the electron with the charged nucleus is shown in green. The new potential for spin up (blue) and spin down (red) electrons are shown after spin-orbit corrections have been taken into account

In physics, Mott scattering is elastic electron scattering from nuclei. It is a form of Coulomb scattering that requires treatment of spin-coupling. It is named after Nevill Francis Mott, who first developed the theory in 1929.

Mott scattering is similar to Rutherford scattering but electrons are used instead of alpha particles as they do not interact via the strong interaction (only through weak interaction and electromagnetism), which enable electrons to penetrate the atomic nucleus, giving valuable insight into the nuclear structure.

== History ==
Mott scattering derives from a 1929 paper by Nevill Mott which proposed a mechanism for experimentally verifying free electron spin quantization. Samuel Goudsmit and George Eugene Uhlenbeck had proposed electron spin and spin-orbit coupling to explain line splitting in atomic spectra in 1925 and by 1928 Paul Dirac had a relativistic quantum theory incorporating these ideas. As Mott details in the first part of his paper, direct observation of free electron spin was thought to be impossible due to issues with the uncertainty principle. Mott proposed double scattering of a high energy beam of electrons from atomic nuclei. The first backscattering event would polarize the beam transverse to the scattering plane; the second scattering event above or below the plane would then have measurable intensity differences to the left or right in an amounts according to the degree of polarization. The predicted effect was finally observed experimentally 1942.

During the 1950s, Noah Sherman analyzed detailed relativistic electron scattering calculations of the intensity asymmetry in terms of a function later called the Sherman function. This concept became the basis for Mott electron polarimetry. The first successful measurement of the electron g factor in 1954, used this technique.

== Electron polarimeter ==
In Mott's original paper he proposed measuring the free electron spin with two scattering events, one that created polarization and one that measured the degree of polarization. The second half of this concept forms an electron polarimeter. The electron beam is directed at a gold foil. Gold has a high atomic number (Z), is non-reactive (does not form an oxide layer), and can be easily made into a thin film (reducing multiple scattering). Two detectors are placed the same scattering angle to the left and right of the foil to count the number of scattered electrons. The measured asymmetry A, given by:

$$A = \frac{I^{\rm right}-I^{\rm left}}{I^{\rm right}+I^{\rm left}}$$

is proportional to the degree of spin polarization P according to A = SP, where S is the Sherman function.

Electron polarimeters can be used to study polarized electron-atom interactions, spin dependence of electrons scattered or emitted from magnetic surfaces, measuring parity violation in high energy inelastic scattering from atoms, and tests of special relativity.

== Theory ==
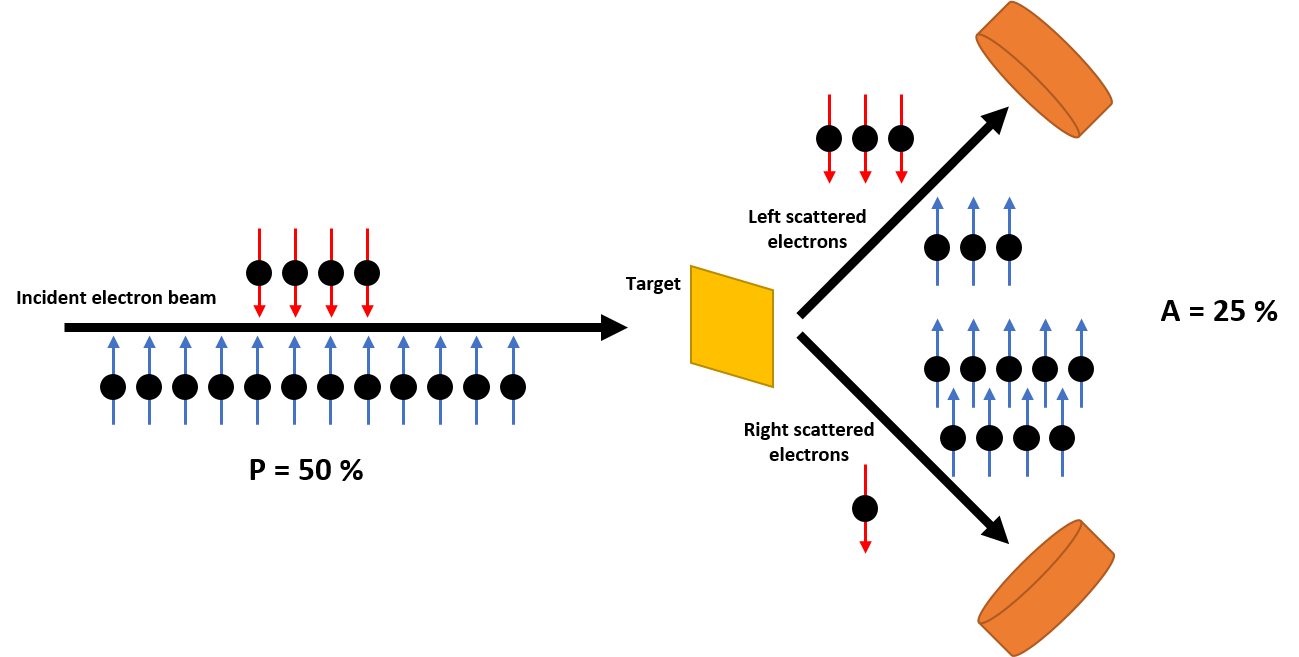
Mott scattering of an electron beam with $S(\theta)=0.5$

Qualitatively, Mott scattering can be analyzed with classical models. In the frame of the electron, the in-coming nucleus represents a Coulomb scattering center. Due to its charge it creates a circulating magnetic field in the plane perpendicular to its motion. As the magnetic field points in opposite directions on either side of the nucleus, and electrons interact differently depending on whether their spins are aligned or anti-aligned with the field, spin-up and spin-down electrons are preferentially scattered in different directions from one another. At backscattering angles the smaller spin-dependent forces can alter the cross section to a measurable amount.

Mathematically the magnetic field, B, is related to the electric field of the nucleus, E, and the velocity of the scattering as:
$$\mathbf{B} = \frac{1}{c} \mathbf{v}\times
\mathbf{E}$$
Writing E in terms of r, the separation of the scattering particles, $\mathbf{E} = (Ze/r^3)\mathbf{r},$ gives
$$\mathbf{B} = \frac{Ze}{mcr^3} \mathbf{L}$$
where $\mathbf{L} = m \mathbf{r}\times\mathbf{v}$ is the orbital angular momentum of the electron about the nucleus. The electron's spin magnetic moment $\mathbf{\mu_s}$ interacts with the magnetic field in proportion to its alignment with that field:
$$V_{\mathrm{SO}} = \mathbf{\mu_s}\cdot\mathbf{B} = \mathbf{\mu_s}\cdot\frac{Ze}{2mcr^3} \mathbf{L}$$
Finally, the electron's magnetic moment relates to its spin $\mathbf{\mu_s} = -(ge/2mc)\mathbf{S}$:
$$V_{\mathrm{SO}} = \frac{Ze^2}{2m^2c^2r^3} \mathbf{L}\cdot\mathbf{S}$$
This potential term works in addition to Coulomb potential, altering the spin averaged cross section I according to Sherman's spin asymmetry function, S
$$\sigma(\theta) = I(\theta)[1 + S(\theta)\mathbf{P}\cdot\mathbf{n}]$$
for polarization P and a unit vector n in the direction of the orbital angular momentum $\mathbf{L}$.

The equation for the Mott cross section includes an inelastic scattering term to take into account the recoil of the target proton or nucleus. It also can be corrected for relativistic effects of high energy electrons, and for their magnetic moment.

=== Relation to electron diffraction ===
When an experimentally found diffraction pattern deviates from the mathematically derived Mott scattering, it gives clues as to the size and shape of an atomic nucleus The reason is that the Mott cross section assumes only point-particle Coulombic and magnetic interactions between the incoming electrons and the target. When the target is a charged sphere rather than a point, additions to the Mott cross section equation (form factor terms) can be used to probe the distribution of the charge inside the sphere.

The Born approximation of the diffraction of a beam of electrons by atomic nuclei is an extension of Mott scattering.
