= Mandelstam variables =

Variables used in scattering processes

In this diagram, two particles come in with momenta p_{1} and p_{2}, they interact in some fashion, and then two particles with different momentum (p_{3} and p_{4}) leave.

In theoretical physics, the Mandelstam variables are numerical quantities that encode the energy, momentum, and angles of particles in a scattering process in a Lorentz-invariant fashion. They are used for scattering processes of two particles to two particles. The Mandelstam variables were first introduced by physicist Stanley Mandelstam in 1958.

If the Minkowski metric is chosen to be diag(1, -1, -1, -1), the Mandelstam variables s, t, u are then defined by

$$s = (p_1 + p_2)^2 c^2 = (p_3 + p_4)^2 c^2,$$
$$t = (p_1 - p_3)^2 c^2 = (p_4 - p_2)^2 c^2,$$
$$u = (p_1 - p_4)^2 c^2 = (p_3 - p_2)^2 c^2,$$

where p_{1} and p_{2} are the four-momenta of the incoming particles and p_{3} and p_{4} are the four-momenta of the outgoing particles.

$s$ is also known as the square of the center-of-mass energy (invariant mass) and $t$ as the square of the four-momentum transfer.

== Feynman diagrams ==
The letters s, t, u are also used in the terms s-channel (timelike channel), t-channel, and u-channel (both spacelike channels). These channels represent different Feynman diagrams or different possible scattering events where the interaction involves the exchange of an intermediate particle whose squared four-momentum equals s, t, u, respectively.

s-channel	t-channel	u-channel

For example, the s-channel corresponds to the particles 1,2 joining into an intermediate particle that eventually splits into 3,4: the s-channel is the only way that resonances and new unstable particles may be discovered provided their lifetimes are long enough that they are directly detectable. The t-channel represents the process in which the particle 1 emits the intermediate particle and becomes the final particle 3, while the particle 2 absorbs the intermediate particle and becomes 4. The u-channel is the t-channel with the role of the particles 3,4 interchanged.

When evaluating a Feynman amplitude one often finds scalar products of the external four-momenta. One can use the Mandelstam variables to simplify these:

$$(p_1 c) \cdot (p_2 c) = \frac{1}{2}\left(s - \left(m_1 c^2\right)^2 - \left(m_2 c^2\right)^2\right),$$
$$(p_1 c) \cdot (p_3 c) = \frac{1}{2}\left(\left(m_1 c^2\right)^2 + \left(m_3 c^2\right)^2 - t\right),$$
$$(p_1 c) \cdot (p_4 c) = \frac{1}{2}\left(\left(m_1 c^2\right)^2 + \left(m_4 c^2\right)^2 - u\right),$$

where $m_i$ is the mass of the particle with corresponding momentum $p_i$.

== Sum ==
Note that

$$s + t + u = \left(m_1 c^2\right)^2 + \left(m_2 c^2\right)^2 + \left(m_3 c^2\right)^2 + \left(m_4 c^2\right)^2$$

where m_{i} is the mass of particle i.

Proof

To prove this, we need to use two facts: the square of a particle's four-momentum is the square of its mass,

$$p_i^2 = (m_i c)^2,$$

and conservation of four-momentum,

$$p_1 + p_2 = p_3 + p_4,$$
$$p_1 = -p_2 + p_3 + p_4.$$

So, to begin,

$$s/c^2 = (p_1 + p_2)^2 = p_1^2 + p_2^2 + 2p_1 \cdot p_2,$$
$$t/c^2 = (p_1 - p_3)^2 = p_1^2 + p_3^2 - 2p_1 \cdot p_3,$$
$$u/c^2 = (p_1 - p_4)^2 = p_1^2 + p_4^2 - 2p_1 \cdot p_4.$$

Adding the three while inserting squared masses leads to

$$(s + t + u)/c^2 = (m_1 c)^2 + (m_2 c)^2 + (m_3 c)^2 + (m_4 c)^2 + 2p_1^2 + 2p_1 \cdot p_2 - 2p_1 \cdot p_3 - 2p_1 \cdot p_4.$$

Then note that the last four terms add up to zero using conservation of four-momentum,

$$2p_1^2 + 2p_1 \cdot p_2 - 2p_1 \cdot p_3 - 2p_1 \cdot p_4 = 2p_1 \cdot (p_1 + p_2 - p_3 - p_4) = 0.$$

So finally,

$$(s + t + u)/c^2 = (m_1 c)^2 + (m_2 c)^2 + (m_3 c)^2 + (m_4 c)^2.$$

== Relativistic limit ==
In the relativistic limit, the momentum (speed) is large, so using the relativistic energy-momentum equation, the energy becomes essentially the momentum norm (e.g. $E^2 = \mathbf{p} \cdot \mathbf{p} + m_0^2$ becomes $E^2 \approx \mathbf{p} \cdot \mathbf{p}$). The rest mass can be neglected.

So, for example,

$$s/c^2 = (p_1 + p_2)^2 = p_1^2 + p_2^2 + 2 p_1 \cdot p_2 \approx 2 p_1 \cdot p_2,$$

because $p_1^2 = (m_1 c)^2$ and $p_2^2 = (m_2 c)^2$. Thus,

$s/c^2 \approx$	$2 p_1 \cdot p_2 \approx$	$2 p_3 \cdot p_4,$
$t/c^2 \approx$	$-2 p_1 \cdot p_3 \approx$	$-2 p_2 \cdot p_4,$
$u/c^2 \approx$	$-2 p_1 \cdot p_4 \approx$	$-2 p_3 \cdot p_2.$

== See also ==
- Feynman diagrams
- Bhabha scattering
- Møller scattering
- Compton scattering
