= Møller scattering =

Electron-electron scattering

Feynman diagrams (time from left to right)
t-channel
u-channel

Møller scattering is the name given to electron-electron scattering in quantum field theory, named after the Danish physicist Christian Møller who derived it in 1932. The electron interaction that is idealized in Møller scattering forms the theoretical basis of many familiar phenomena such as the repulsion of electrons in the helium atom. While formerly many particle colliders were designed specifically for electron-electron collisions, more recently electron-positron colliders have become more common. Nevertheless, Møller scattering remains a paradigmatic process within the theory of particle interactions.

We can express this process in the usual notation, often used in particle physics:
$$e^{-} e^{-} \longrightarrow e^{-} e^{-},$$

In quantum electrodynamics, there are two tree-level Feynman diagrams describing the process: a t-channel diagram in which the electrons exchange a photon and a similar u-channel diagram. Crossing symmetry, one of the tricks often used to evaluate Feynman diagrams, in this case implies that Møller scattering should have the same cross section as Bhabha scattering (electron-positron scattering).

In the electroweak theory the process is instead described by four tree-level diagrams: the two from QED and an identical pair in which a Z boson is exchanged instead of a photon. The weak force is purely left-handed, but the weak and electromagnetic forces mix into the particles we observe. The photon is symmetric by construction, but the Z boson prefers left-handed particles to right-handed particles. Thus the cross sections for left-handed electrons and right-handed differ. The difference was first noticed by the Russian physicist Yakov Zel'dovich in 1959, but at the time he believed the parity violating asymmetry (a few hundred parts per billion) was too small to be observed. This parity violating asymmetry can be measured by firing a polarized beam of electrons through an unpolarized electron target (liquid hydrogen, for instance), as was done by an experiment at the Stanford Linear Accelerator Center, SLAC-E158. The asymmetry in Møller scattering is

$$A_{\rm PV}=-m_e E \frac{G_{\rm F}}{ \sqrt{2} \pi \alpha } \frac {16 \sin^2 \Theta_{\text{cm}}}
{\left(3+\cos^2 \Theta_{\text{cm}} \right)^2 } \left( \frac{1}{4} - \sin^2 \theta_{\rm W} \right),$$

where m_{e} is the electron mass, E the energy of the incoming electron (in the reference frame of the other electron), $G_{\rm F}$ is Fermi's constant, $\alpha$ is the fine structure constant, $\Theta_{\text{cm}}$ is the scattering angle in the center of mass frame, and $\theta_{\rm W}$ is the weak mixing angle, also known as the Weinberg angle.

== QED computation ==
The Møller scattering can be calculated from the QED point-of-view, at the tree-level, with the help of the two diagrams shown on this page. These two diagrams are contributing at leading order from the QED point-of-view. If we are taking in account the weak force, which is unified with the electromagnetic force at high energy, then we have to add two tree-level diagram for the exchange of a $Z^0$ boson. Here we will focus our attention on a strict tree-level QED computation of the cross section, which is rather instructive but maybe not the most accurate description from a physical point-of-view.

Before the derivation, we write the 4-momenta as ($p_1$and $p_2$for incoming electrons, $p_3$and $p_4$for outgoing electrons, and $m = m_e$):

$$p_1 = (E, 0, 0, p),~p_2 = (E, 0, 0, -p),$$

$$p_3 = (E, p \sin \theta, 0, p \cos \theta),~p_4 = (E, -p \sin \theta, 0, -p \cos \theta).$$

The Mandelstam variables are:

$$s=(p_1+p_2)^2=(p_3+p_4)^2$$

$$t=(p_1-p_3)^2=(p_4-p_2)^2$$

$$u=(p_1-p_4)^2=(p_3-p_2)^2$$

These Mandelstam variables satisfy the identity: $s + t + u \equiv \sum m_j^2 = 4m^2$.

According to the two diagrams on this page, the matrix element of t-channel is

$$i \mathcal{M}_t = (-ie)^2\bar u(p_3) \gamma^\mu u(p_1)  \frac{-i}{t}  \bar u(p_4) \gamma_\mu u(p_2),$$

the matrix element of u-channel is

$$i \mathcal{M}_u = (-ie)^2\bar u(p_3) \gamma^\mu u(p_2)  \frac{-i}{u}  \bar u(p_4) \gamma_\mu u(p_1).$$

So the sum is

$$\begin{aligned}
i \mathcal{M} & = i (\mathcal{M}_t - \mathcal{M}_u)\\
& = -i (-ie)^2 \left[\frac{1}{t} \bar u(p_3) \gamma^\mu u(p_1) \bar u(p_4) \gamma_\mu u(p_2) - \frac{1}{u} \bar u(p_3) \gamma^\mu u(p_2) \bar u(p_4) \gamma_\mu u(p_1) \right].
\end{aligned}$$

Therefore,

$$\begin{aligned}
|\mathcal{M}|^2
&= e^4 \biggl\{ \frac{1}{t^2} [\bar u(p_3) \gamma^\mu u(p_1)] [\bar u(p_1) \gamma^\nu u(p_3)] [\bar u(p_4) \gamma_\mu u(p_2)] [\bar u(p_2) \gamma_\nu u(p_4)]\\
&\qquad+ \frac{1}{u^2} [\bar u(p_3) \gamma^\mu u(p_2)] [\bar u(p_2) \gamma^\nu u(p_3)] [\bar u(p_4) \gamma_\mu u(p_1)] [\bar u(p_1) \gamma_\nu u(p_4)]\\
&\qquad- \frac{1}{tu} [\bar u(p_3) \gamma^\mu u(p_1)] [\bar u(p_2) \gamma^\nu u(p_3)] [\bar u(p_4) \gamma_\mu u(p_2)] [\bar u(p_1) \gamma_\nu u(p_4)]\\
&\qquad- \frac{1}{tu} [\bar u(p_3) \gamma^\mu u(p_2)] [\bar u(p_1) \gamma^\nu u(p_3)] [\bar u(p_4) \gamma_\mu u(p_1)] [\bar u(p_2) \gamma_\nu u(p_4)]
\biggr\}.
\end{aligned}$$

To calculate the unpolarized cross section, we average over initial spins and sum over final spins, with the factor 1/4 (1/2 for each incoming electron):

$$\begin{aligned}
\frac{1}{4} \sum_\text{spins} |\mathcal{M}|^2 & =
\frac{e^4}{4} \biggl\{ \frac{1}{t^2} \mathrm{Tr}[\gamma^\mu (\not p_1 + m)  \gamma^\nu (\not p_3 + m)]  \mathrm{Tr}[\gamma_\mu (\not p_2 + m)  \gamma_\nu (\not p_4 + m)]\\
&~~+ \frac{1}{u^2}  \mathrm{Tr}[\gamma^\mu (\not p_2 + m)  \gamma^\nu (\not p_3 + m)]  \mathrm{Tr}[\gamma_\mu (\not p_1 + m)  \gamma_\nu (\not p_4 + m)]\\
&~~- \frac{2}{tu} \mathrm{Tr} [ (\not p_3 + m) \gamma^\mu (\not p_1 + m) \gamma^\nu (\not p_4 + m) \gamma_\mu (\not p_2 + m) \gamma_\nu]
\biggl\}
\end{aligned}$$

where we have used the relation $\sum_s u^s(p) \bar u^s(p) = \not p + m = \gamma^\mu p_\mu + m$. We would next calculate the traces.

The first term in the braces is

$$\begin{aligned}
&~~\frac{1}{t^2} \mathrm{Tr}[\gamma^\mu (\not p_1 + m)  \gamma^\nu (\not p_3 + m)]  \mathrm{Tr}[\gamma_\mu (\not p_2 + m)  \gamma_\nu (\not p_4 + m)]\\
&= \frac{16}{t^2} (p_1^\mu p_3^\nu + p_3^\mu p_1^\nu + ( - p_{13} + m^2) g^{\mu \nu}) (p_{2 \mu} p_{4 \nu} + p_{4 \mu} p_{2 \nu} + ( - p_{24} + m^2) g_{\mu \nu})\\
&= \frac{32}{t^2} \big(   p_{12} p_{34} + p_{23} p_{14} - m^2 p_{13} - m^2 p_{24} + 2 m^4 \big)\\
&= \frac{32}{t^2} \big(   p_{12}^2 + p_{14}^2 + 2 m^2 (p_{14} - p_{12})  \big)\\
&= \frac{8}{t^2} (s^2 + u^2 - 8m^2(s + u) + 24 m^4)
\end{aligned}$$

Here $p_{ij} \equiv p_i \cdot p_j$, and we have used the $\gamma$-matrix identity

$$\mathrm{Tr}[\gamma^\mu\gamma^\nu\gamma^\rho\gamma^\sigma] = 4\left(\eta^{\mu\nu}\eta^{\rho\sigma} - \eta^{\mu\rho}\eta^{\nu\sigma} + \eta^{\mu\sigma}\eta^{\nu\rho}\right)$$

and that trace of any product of an odd number of $\gamma^\mu$ is zero.

Similarly, the second term is

$$\begin{aligned}
&~~\frac{1}{u^2} \mathrm{Tr}[\gamma^\mu (\not p_2 + m)  \gamma^\nu (\not p_3 + m)]  \mathrm{Tr}[\gamma_\mu (\not p_1 + m)  \gamma_\nu (\not p_4 + m)]\\
&= \frac{32}{u^2} \big(   p_{12} p_{34} + p_{13} p_{24} - m^2 p_{23} - m^2 p_{14} + 2 m^4 \big)\\
&= \frac{8}{u^2} (s^2 + t^2 - 8m^2(s + t) + 24 m^4)
\end{aligned}$$

Using the $\gamma$-matrix identities

$$\mathrm{Tr}[\gamma^\mu \gamma^\nu \gamma_\mu \gamma_\nu ] = -32,$$

$$\mathrm{Tr}[\gamma^\rho \gamma^\mu \gamma^\sigma \gamma^\nu \gamma_\mu \gamma_\nu ] = \mathrm{Tr}[\gamma^\rho \gamma^\mu \gamma^\nu \gamma^\sigma \gamma_\mu \gamma_\nu ] = 16g^{\rho \sigma},$$

$$\mathrm{Tr}[\gamma^\rho \gamma^\mu \gamma^\sigma \gamma^\nu \gamma^\lambda \gamma_\mu \gamma^\tau \gamma_\nu ] = -32g^{\rho \lambda} g^{\sigma \tau},$$

and the identity of Mandelstam variables: $s + t + u \equiv \sum m_j^2$, we get the third term

$$\begin{aligned}&- \frac{2}{tu} \mathrm{Tr} \left[ (\not p_3 + m) \gamma^\mu (\not p_1 + m) \gamma^\nu (\not p_4 + m) \gamma_\mu (\not p_2 + m) \gamma_\nu\right]\\
={}& - \frac{32}{tu} \left( - 2 p_{12} p_{34} + 2 m^2 (p_{12} + p_{13} + p_{14} ) - 2m^4 \right)\\
={}& \frac{16}{tu} \left(s^2 - 8 m^2 s + 12 m^4\right)
\end{aligned}$$

Therefore,

$$\begin{aligned}
\overline{|\mathcal{M}|^2}
& \equiv \frac{1}{4} \sum_\text{spins} |\mathcal{M}|^2\\
& = 2 e^4 \Big\{ \frac{1}{t^2} \big( s^2 + u^2 - 8m^2(s + u) + 24 m^4 \big)\\
&~~+ \frac{1}{u^2} \big( s^2 + t^2 - 8m^2(s + t) + 24 m^4 \big)\\
&~~+ \frac{2}{tu} \big( s^2 - 8 m^2 s + 12 m^4 \big)
\Big\}
\end{aligned}.$$

Substitute in the momenta we have set here, which are

$$s = 4E^2 = E_{CM}^2,$$

$$t = 2p^2 (\cos \theta - 1),$$

$$u = 2p^2 (- \cos \theta - 1).$$

Finally we get the unpolarized cross section
$$\begin{aligned}
\frac{d \sigma}{d \Omega} & = \frac{1}{64 \pi^2 E_{CM}^2} \frac{|\vec p_f|}{|\vec p_i|} \overline{|\mathcal{M}|^2}\\
& = \frac{\alpha^2}{2 E_{CM}^2}  \Big\{ \frac{1}{t^2} \big( s^2 + u^2 - 8m^2(s + u) + 24 m^4 \big)\\
&~~+ \frac{1}{u^2} \big( s^2 + t^2 - 8m^2(s + t) + 24 m^4 \big)\\
&~~+ \frac{2}{tu} \big( s^2 - 8 m^2 s + 12 m^4 \big)
\Big\}\\
& = \frac{\alpha^2}{ E_{CM}^2 p^4 \sin^4 \theta} \Big[ 4(m^2 + 2p^2)^2 + \big( 4p^4 - 3(m^2 + 2p^2)^2 \big) \sin^2 \theta + p^4 \sin^4 \theta \Big].
\end{aligned}$$

with $E^2 = m^2 + p^2$ and $E_{CM} = 2E$.

In the nonrelativistic limit, $m \gg p$,

$$\begin{aligned}
\frac{d \sigma}{d \Omega}
&= \frac{m^4 \alpha^2}{ E_{CM}^2 p^4 \sin^4 \theta} \Big( 4 - 3 \sin^2 \theta \Big) \\
&= \frac{m^4 \alpha^2}{ E_{CM}^2 p^4 \sin^4 \theta} \Big( 1 + 3 \cos^2 \theta \Big).
\end{aligned}$$

In the ultrarelativistic limit, $m \ll p$,

$$\begin{aligned}
\frac{d \sigma}{d \Omega}
&= \frac{\alpha^2}{ E_{CM}^2 p^4 \sin^4 \theta} \Big( 16p^4 - 8 p^4 \sin^2 \theta + p^4 \sin^4 \theta \Big) \\
&= \frac{\alpha^2}{ E_{CM}^2  \sin^4 \theta} \Big( 3 + \cos^2 \theta \Big)^2.
\end{aligned}$$
