= Mott–Bethe formula =

The Mott–Bethe formula is an approximation used to calculate atomic electron scattering form factors, $f_\text{e} (q,Z)$, from atomic X-ray scattering form factors, $f_x(q,Z)$. The formula was derived independently by Hans Bethe and Neville Mott both in 1930, and simply follows from applying the first Born approximation for the scattering of electrons via the Coulomb interaction together with the Poisson equation for the charge density of an atom (including both the nucleus and electron cloud) in the Fourier domain. Following the first Born approximation,

$$f_\text{e}(q,Z)=\frac{me^2}{32\pi^3\hbar^2\epsilon_0}\Bigg(\frac{Z-f_x(q,Z)}{q^2}\Bigg) =\frac{1}{8\pi^2 a_0}\Bigg(\frac{Z-f_x(q,Z)}{q^2}\Bigg) \approx (0.2393~\textrm{nm}^{-1})\cdot \Bigg(\frac{Z-f_x(q,Z)}{q^2}\Bigg)$$

Here, $q$ is the magnitude of the scattering vector of momentum-transfer cross section in reciprocal space (in units of inverse distance), $Z$ the atomic number of the atom, $\hbar$ is the Planck constant, $\epsilon_0$ is the vacuum permittivity, and $m_0$ is the electron rest mass, $a_0$ is the Bohr Radius, and $f_x(q,Z)$ is the dimensionless X-ray scattering form factor for the electron density.

The electron scattering factor $f_\text{e}(q,Z)$ has units of length, as is typical for the scattering factor, unlike the X-ray form factor $f_x(q,Z)$, which is usually presented in dimensionless units. To perform a one-to-one comparison between the electron and X-ray form factors in the same units, the X-ray form factor should be multiplied by the square root of the Thomson cross section $\sqrt{\sigma_{T}} = r_\text{e}$, where $r_\text{e}$ is the classical electron radius, to convert it back to a unit of length.

The Mott–Bethe formula was originally derived for free atoms, and is rigorously true provided the X-ray scattering form factor is known exactly. However, in solids, the accuracy of the Mott–Bethe formula is best for large values of $q$ ($q>0.5$ Å^{−1}) because the distribution of the charge density at smaller $q$ (i.e. long distances) can deviate from the atomic distribution of electrons due the chemical bonds between atoms in a solid. For smaller values of $q$, $f_\text{e}(q,Z)$ can be determined from tabulated values, such as those in the International Tables for Crystallography using (non)relativistic Hartree–Fock calculations, or other numerical parameterizations of the calculated charge distribution of atoms.
