= Nevill Mott =

British theoretical physicist (1905–1996)

Sir Nevill Mott CH FRS

37th Master of Gonville and Caius College, Cambridge
- In office 1959–1966
- Preceded by: Sir James Chadwick
- Succeeded by: Joseph Needham

Personal details
- Born: Nevill Francis Mott; 30 September 1905 Leeds, England
- Died: 8 August 1996 (aged 90) Milton Keynes, England
- Education: Clifton College; St John's College, Cambridge
- Known for: Mott problem; Mott insulator; Mott scattering; Mott polynomials; Mott formula; Mott variable-range hopping; Mott–Bethe formula; Mott–Gurney law; Mott–Schottky equation; Mott–Schottky plot; Schottky–Mott rule; Wannier–Mott exciton; Band bending; Pseudogap
- Awards: Hughes Medal (1941); Royal Medal (1953); Copley Medal (1972); Faraday Medal (1973); Nobel Prize in Physics (1977)
- Scientific career
- Fields: Condensed matter physics
- Workplaces: Gonville and Caius College, Cambridge (1930–1933); University of Bristol (1933–1954); University of Cambridge (1954–1971)
- Academic advisors: Ralph Fowler
- Doctoral students: Klaus Fuchs (1936); Kun Huang (1948); John D. Eshelby (1950); Jacques Friedel (1952); Volker Heine (1956)

Sir Nevill Francis Mott (30 September 1905 – 8 August 1996) was a British theoretical physicist who won the Nobel Prize for Physics in 1977 for his work on the electronic structure of magnetic and disordered systems, especially amorphous semiconductors. The Prize was shared with Philip W. Anderson and John Van Vleck. The three had conducted loosely related research. Mott and Anderson clarified the reasons why magnetic or amorphous materials can sometimes be metallic and sometimes insulating.

== Early life and education ==
Nevill Francis Mott was born on 30 September 1905 in Leeds, England, the son of Charles Francis Mott and Lilian Mary Reynolds, a granddaughter of Sir John Richardson, and great granddaughter of Sir John Henry Pelly, 1st Baronet. Miss Reynolds was a Cambridge Mathematics Tripos graduate and at Cambridge was the best woman mathematician of her year. His parents met in the Cavendish Laboratory, when both were engaged in physics research under J. J. Thomson.

Nevill grew up first in the village of Giggleswick in the West Riding of Yorkshire, where his father was Senior Science Master at Giggleswick School. His mother also taught Maths at the School. The family moved (due to his father's jobs) first to Staffordshire, then to Chester and finally Liverpool, where his father had been appointed Director of Education. Mott was at first educated at home by his mother. At age ten, he began formal education at Clifton College in Bristol, followed by study at St John's College, Cambridge—where he read the Mathematics Tripos, supervised by Ralph Fowler.

== Career and research ==
In 1929, Mott was appointed a lecturer in the School of Physics at the University of Manchester. He returned to Cambridge in 1930 as a Fellow of and lecturer at Gonville and Caius College, Cambridge, and in 1933 moved to the University of Bristol as Melville Wills Professor of Theoretical Physics. In 1948, he became Henry Overton Wills Professor of Physics and Director of the Henry Herbert Wills Physical Laboratory at Bristol. In 1954, he was appointed Cavendish Professor of Physics at Cambridge, a position he held until 1971. He was instrumental in the painful cancellation of the planned particle accelerator because of its very high cost. He also served as Master of Gonville and Caius College, 1959–1966.

His early works were on the theoretical analysis of collisions in gases, notably the collision with spin flip of an electron against a hydrogen atom, which would stimulate subsequent works by André Blandin and Jun Kondo about similar effects between conduction electrons, as well as magnetic properties in metals. This sort of activity led Mott to writing two books. The first one, which was edited together with Ian Sneddon, gives a simple and clear description of quantum mechanics, with an emphasis on the Schrödinger equation in real space. The second describes atomic and electronic collisions in gases, using the rotational symmetry of electronic states in the Hartree–Fock method.

But already in the middle of the 1930s, Mott's interests had broadened to include solid states, leading to two more books that would have a great impact on the development of the field in the years prior and after World War II. In 1936, Theory of the Properties of Metals and Alloys (written together with H. Jones) describes a simplified framework which led to rapid progress.

The concept of nearly free valence electrons in metallic alloys explained the special stability of the Hume-Rothery phases if the Fermi sphere of the sp valence electron, treated as free, would be scattered by the Brillouin zone boundaries of the atomic structure. The description of the impurities in metals by the Thomas Fermi approximation would explain why such impurities would not interact at long range. Finally the delocalisation of the valence d electrons in transitional metals and alloys would explain the possibility for the magnetic moments of atoms to be expressed as fractions of Bohr magnetons, leading to ferro or antiferromagnetic coupling at short range. This last contribution, produced at the first international conference on magnetism, held in Strasbourg in May 1939, reinforced similar points of view defended at the time in France by the future Nobel laureate Louis Néel. In 1949, Mott suggested to Jacques Friedel to use the approach developed together with Marvey for a more accurate description of the electric-field screening of the impurity in a metal, leading to the characteristic long range charge oscillations. Friedel also used the concept developed in that book of virtual bound level to describe a situation when the atomic potential considered is not quite strong enough to create a (real) bound level of symmetry e ≠ o. The consequences of these remarks on the more exact approaches of cohesion in rp as well as d metals were mostly developed by his students in Orsay.

The second book, with Ronald Wilfred Gurney, On the Physical Chemistry of Solids was more wide-ranging. It treated notably of the oxidation of metals at low temperatures, where it described the growth of the oxide layer as due to the electric field developed between the metal and absorbed oxygen ions, which could force the way of metallic or oxygen ions through a disordered oxide layer. The book also analysed the photographic reactions in ionic silver compound in terms of precipitation of silver ions into metallic clusters.

This second field had a direct and long lasting consequence on the research activity of John (Jack) Mitchell. Mott's accomplishments include explaining theoretically the effect of light on a photographic emulsion (see latent image). His work on oxidation, besides fostering new research in the field (notably by J. Bénard and Nicolás Cabrera), was the root of the concept of the band gap produced in semiconductors by gradients in the distribution of donor and acceptor impurities.

During World War II, Mott joined the "Army Cell" of radar researchers. He was put in charge of getting the Army's GL Mk. II radar working in the presence of serious calibration problems that caused the measurements to change as the antenna tracked its targets. He solved this problem by designing a large metal wire mat that was built around the radars to provide a very flat reference plane.

During the war Mott worked on the role of plastic deformation in the progression of fracture cracks. When he returned to Bristol after the war, his having met and hired Charles Frank enabled the two of them to make considerable advances in the study of dislocations, with the help of others such as Frank Nabarro and Alan Cottrell. Bristol became an important centre of research in this topic, especially at the end of the 1940s. If Mott only produced early and somewhat minor contributions to that field, notably on alloy hardening with Nabarro and on the topology of a dislocation network lowering the apparent elastic constants of a crystal, there is no doubt that Mott's enthusiasm played its role in the three major steps forward in the field by Frank on crystal growth and plasticity and later, in Cambridge, by Peter Hirsch on thin film electron microscopy.

At the same time, however, Mott gave a lot of thought to electronic correlations and their possible role in Verwey's compounds such as nickel oxides which could switch from metals to nonmetallic insulators under various physical conditions - this is known as the Mott transition. The term Mott insulator is also named for him, as well as the Mott polynomials, which he introduced.

== Personal life ==
Mott was married to Ruth Eleanor Horder, and had two daughters, Elizabeth and Alice. Alice was an educationist who worked with Claus Moser and married the mathematician Mike Crampin, who was a professor of mathematics at The Open University. Neville Mott retired to live near the Crampins in Aspley Guise, Milton Keynes, where he died on 8 August 1996 at the age of 90. His autobiography, A Life in Science, was published in 1986 by Taylor & Francis. His great grandfather was Sir John Richardson, the arctic explorer.

== Recognition ==
=== Memberships ===
Year	Organisation	Type	Ref.
1936	(United Kingdom) Royal Society	Fellow	

=== Awards ===
Year	Organisation	Award	Citation	Ref.
1941	(United Kingdom) Royal Society	Hughes Medal	"For his fertile application of the principles of quantum theory to many branches of physics, especially in the fields of nuclear and collision theory, in the theory of metals and in the theory of photographic emulsions."	
1953	(United Kingdom) Royal Society	Royal Medal	"In recognition of his eminent work in the field of quantum theory and particularly in the theory of metals."	
1972	(United Kingdom) Royal Society	Copley Medal	"In recognition of his original contributions over a long period to atomic and solid state physics."	
1973	(United Kingdom) Institution of Electrical Engineers	Faraday Medal		
1977	(Sweden) Royal Swedish Academy of Sciences	Nobel Prize in Physics (Note: Awarded jointly with Philip W. Anderson and John Van Vleck.)	"For their fundamental theoretical investigations of the electronic structure of magnetic and disordered systems."	

=== Chivalry ===
Year	Head of state	Title/Order	Ref.
1962	(United Kingdom) Elizabeth II	Knight Bachelor	
1995	(United Kingdom) Elizabeth II	Order of the Companions of Honour	

== Publications ==
N. F. Mott revived the old Philosophical Magazine and transformed it into a lively publication essentially centred on the then-new field of solid state physics, attracting writers, readers and general interest on a wide scale. After receiving a paper on point defects in crystals by Frederick Seitz that was obviously too long for the journal, Mott decided to create a new publication, Advances in Physics, for such review papers. Both publications are still active in 2017.

- N. F. Mott, "The Wave Mechanics of α-Ray Tracks", Proceedings of the Royal Society (1929) A126, pp. 79–84, doi:10.1098/rspa.1929.0205. (reprinted as Sec. I-6 of Quantum Theory and Measurement, J. A. Wheeler. and W. H. Zurek, (1983) Princeton).
- N. F. Mott, Metal-Insulator Transitions, second edition (Taylor & Francis, London, 1990). ISBN 0-85066-783-6, ISBN 978-0-85066-783-7
- N. F. Mott, A Life in Science (Taylor & Francis, London, 1986). ISBN 0-85066-333-4, ISBN 978-0-85066-333-4
- N. F. Mott, H. Jones, The Theory of Properties of Metals and Alloys, (Dover Publications Inc., New York, 1958)
- Brian Pippard, Nevill Francis Mott, Physics Today, March 1997, pp. 95 and 96: (pdf).

== Notes ==
Academic offices
Preceded by Sir James Chadwick	Master of Gonville and Caius College; 1959–1966	Succeeded by Joseph Needham
Preceded by Lawrence Bragg	Cavendish Professor of Experimental Physics, University of Cambridge; 1954-1971	Succeeded by Brian Pippard (as Cavendish Professor of Physics)
