= Hans Bethe =

German-American physicist (1906–2005)

Hans Bethe ForMemRS
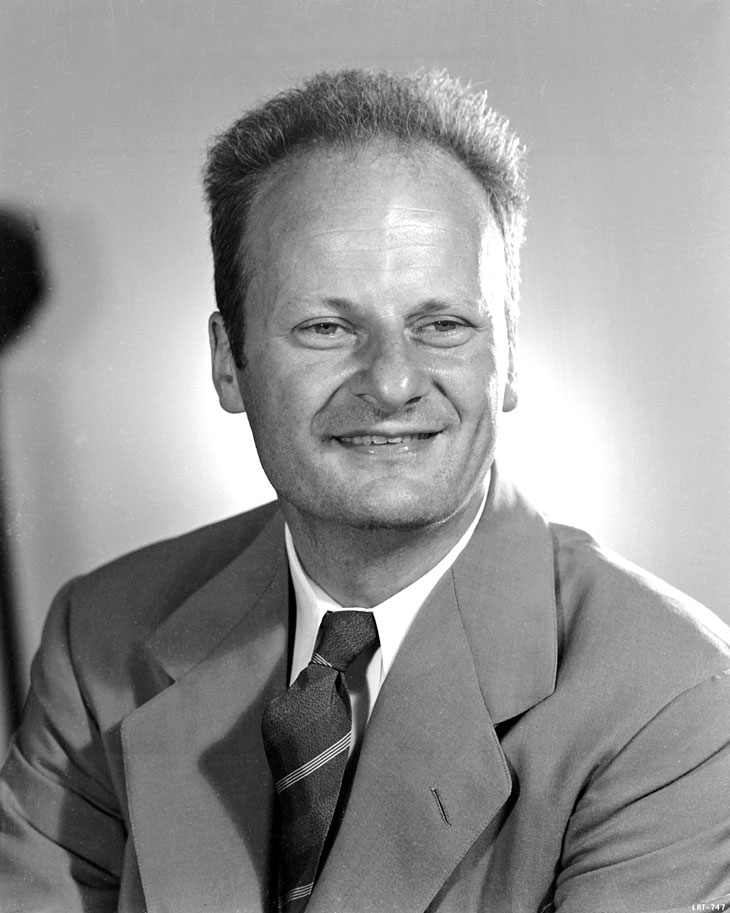
- Born: Hans Albrecht Eduard Bethe; July 2, 1906; Straßburg, Alsace–Lorraine, German Empire
- Died: March 6, 2005 (aged 98); Ithaca, New York, U.S.
- Citizenship: Germany; United States (1941–2005)
- Education: University of Frankfurt am Main; Ludwig-Maximilians-Universität München (PhD)
- Known for: Bethe ansatz; Bethe formula; Bethe lattice; Bethe–Slater curve; Bethe–Salpeter equation; Bethe–Feynman formula; Bethe–Weizsäcker formula; Bethe–Weizsäcker process; BZT fluid; Mott–Bethe formula; Cavity perturbation theory; Crystal field theory; Double group; Quantum electrodynamics; Stellar nucleosynthesis
- Spouse: Rose Ewald (m. 1939) (1917–2019)
- Awards: Henry Draper Medal (1947); ForMemRS (1957); Franklin Medal (1959); Eddington Medal (1961); Enrico Fermi Award (1961); Rumford Prize (1963); Nobel Prize in Physics (1967); National Medal of Science (1975); Lomonosov Gold Medal (1989); Oersted Medal (1993); Bruce Medal (2001); Benjamin Franklin Medal (2005)
- Scientific career
- Fields: Nuclear physics; Theoretical physics
- Workplaces: University of Tübingen; Cornell University; University of Bristol; University of Manchester; University of Chicago
- Thesis: Theorie der Beugung von Elektronen an Kristallen (1928)
- Doctoral advisor: Arnold Sommerfeld
- Doctoral students: Michel Baranger; David Breed Beard; Hildred Blewett; Peter A. Carruthers; Ajoy Ghatak; Jeffrey Goldstone; Roman Jackiw; Francis E. Low; Robert Eugene Marshak; Walter McAfee; Boyce McDaniel; Asoke Nath Mitra; Michael Nauenberg; John W. Negele; Mark Nelkin; Ramamurti Rajaraman; J. J. Sakurai; Gordon Shaw; David J. Thouless
- Other notable students: Freeman Dyson

Hans Albrecht Eduard Bethe (/ˈbɛθə/; German: [ˈhans ˈbeːtə]; 2 July 1906 – 6 March 2005) was a German-American physicist who made major contributions to nuclear physics, astrophysics, quantum electrodynamics and solid-state physics, and received the Nobel Prize in Physics in 1967 for his work on the theory of stellar nucleosynthesis. For most of his career, Bethe was a professor at Cornell University.

In 1931, Bethe developed the Bethe ansatz, which is a method for finding the exact solutions for the eigenvalues and eigenvectors of certain one-dimensional quantum many-body models. In 1939, Bethe published a paper which established the CNO cycle as the primary energy source for heavier stars in the main sequence classification of stars, which earned him a Nobel Prize in 1967. During World War II, Bethe was head of the Theoretical Division at the secret Los Alamos National Laboratory that developed the first atomic bombs. There he played a key role in calculating the critical mass of the weapons and developing the theory behind the implosion method used in both the Trinity test and the "Fat Man" weapon dropped on Nagasaki in August 1945.

After the war, Bethe played an important role in the development of the hydrogen bomb, as he also served as the head of the theoretical division for the project, although he had originally joined the project with the hope of proving it could not be made. He later campaigned with Albert Einstein and the Emergency Committee of Atomic Scientists against nuclear testing and the nuclear arms race. He helped persuade the Kennedy and Nixon administrations to sign, respectively, the 1963 Partial Nuclear Test Ban Treaty and 1972 Anti-Ballistic Missile Treaty (SALT I). In 1947, he wrote an important paper which provided the calculation of the Lamb shift, which is credited with revolutionizing quantum electrodynamics and further "opened the way to the modern era of particle physics". He contributed to the understanding of neutrinos and was key in the solving of the solar neutrino problem. He contributed to the understanding of supernovas and their processes.

His scientific research never ceased, and he was publishing papers well into his nineties, making him one of the few scientists to have published at least one major paper in his field during every decade of his career, which in Bethe's case spanned nearly seventy years. Physicist Freeman Dyson, once his doctoral student, called him "the supreme problem-solver of the 20th century", and cosmologist Edward Kolb called him "the last of the old masters" of physics.

== Early life ==
Bethe was born in Strasbourg, which at the time was part of the Reichsland Elsaß-Lothringen, Germany, on July 2, 1906, the only child of Anna (née Kuhn) and Albrecht Bethe, a Privatdozent of physiology at the University of Strasbourg. Although his mother, the daughter of Abraham Kuhn, professor at the University of Strasbourg, had a Jewish background, Bethe was raised Protestant, like his father; and he became an atheist later in life.

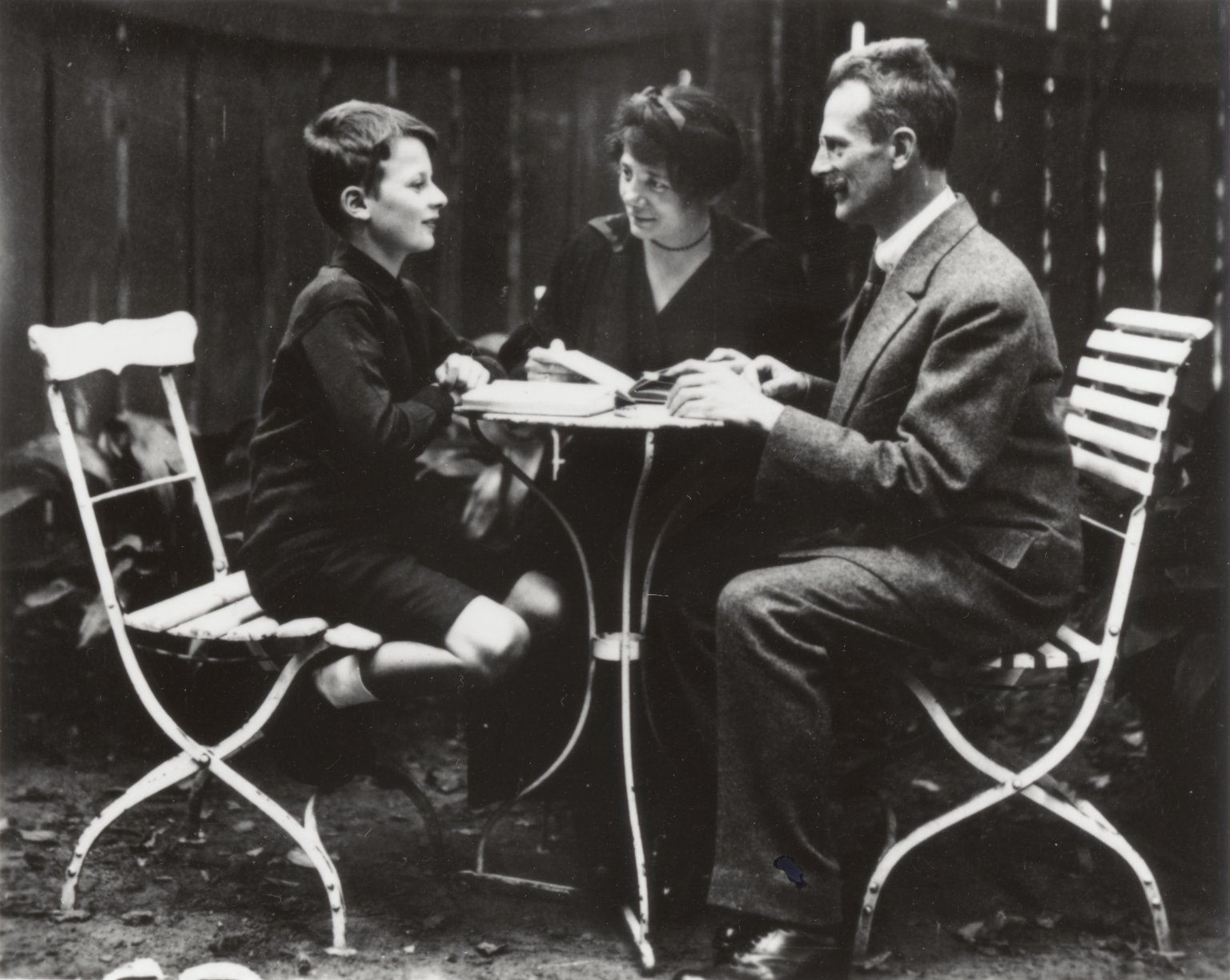
Hans Bethe, aged 12, with his parents

His father accepted a position as professor and director of the Institute of Physiology at Kiel University in 1912, and the family moved into the director's apartment at the institute. Initially, he was schooled privately by a professional teacher as part of a group of eight girls and boys. The family moved again in 1915 when his father became the head of the new Institute of Physiology at the University of Frankfurt am Main.

Bethe attended the Goethe-Gymnasium in Frankfurt, Germany. His education was interrupted in 1916, when he contracted tuberculosis, and he was sent to Bad Kreuznach to recuperate. By 1917, he had recovered sufficiently to attend the local Realschule and the following year, he was sent to the Odenwaldschule, a private, coeducational boarding school. He attended the Goethe-Gymnasium again for his final three years of secondary schooling, from 1922 to 1924.

Having passed his Abitur, Bethe entered the University of Frankfurt in 1924. He decided to major in chemistry. The instruction in physics was poor, and while there were distinguished mathematicians in Frankfurt such as Carl Ludwig Siegel and Otto Szász, Bethe disliked their approaches, which presented mathematics without reference to the other sciences. Bethe found that he was a poor experimentalist who destroyed his lab coat by spilling sulfuric acid on it, but he found the advanced physics taught by the associate professor, Walter Gerlach, more interesting. Gerlach left in 1925 and was replaced by Karl Meissner, who advised Bethe that he should go to a university with a better school of theoretical physics, specifically the Ludwig-Maximilians-Universität München, where he could study under Arnold Sommerfeld.

Bethe entered the Ludwig-Maximilians-Universität München in April 1926, where Sommerfeld took him on as a student on Meissner's recommendation. Sommerfeld taught an advanced course on differential equations in physics, which Bethe enjoyed. Because he was such a renowned scholar, Sommerfeld frequently received advance copies of scientific papers, which he put up for discussion at weekly evening seminars. When Bethe arrived, Sommerfeld had just received Erwin Schrödinger's papers on wave mechanics.

For his PhD thesis, Sommerfeld suggested that Bethe examine electron diffraction in crystals. As a starting point, Sommerfeld suggested Paul Ewald's 1914 paper on X-ray diffraction in crystals. Bethe later recalled that he became too ambitious, and, in pursuit of greater accuracy, his calculations became unnecessarily complicated. When he met Wolfgang Pauli for the first time, Pauli told him: "After Sommerfeld's tales about you, I had expected much better from you than your thesis." "I guess from Pauli," Bethe later recalled, "that was a compliment."

== Early work ==
After Bethe received his doctorate, Erwin Madelung offered him an assistantship in Frankfurt, and in September 1928 Bethe moved in with his father, who had recently divorced his mother. His father had met Vera Congehl earlier that year and married her in 1929. They had two children, Doris, born in 1933, and Klaus, born in 1934.

Bethe did not find the work in Frankfurt very stimulating, and in 1929 he accepted an offer from Ewald at the Technische Hochschule Stuttgart. While there, he wrote what he considered to be his greatest paper, Zur Theorie des Durchgangs schneller Korpuskularstrahlen durch Materie ("The Theory of the Passage of Fast Corpuscular Rays Through Matter"). Starting from Max Born's interpretation of the Schrödinger equation, Bethe produced a simplified formula for collision problems using a Fourier transform, which is known today as the Bethe formula. He submitted this paper for his habilitation in 1930.

Sommerfeld recommended Bethe for a Rockefeller Foundation Travelling Scholarship in 1929. This provided $150 a month (about $3,000 in 2025 dollars (Note: 1634–1699: McCusker, J. J. (1997). How Much Is That in Real Money? A Historical Price Index for Use as a Deflator of Money Values in the Economy of the United States: Addenda et Corrigenda (PDF). American Antiquarian Society. 1700–1799: McCusker, J. J. (1992). How Much Is That in Real Money? A Historical Price Index for Use as a Deflator of Money Values in the Economy of the United States (PDF). American Antiquarian Society. 1800–present: Federal Reserve Bank of Minneapolis. "Consumer Price Index (estimate) 1800–".)) to study abroad. In 1930, Bethe chose to do postdoctoral work at the Cavendish Laboratory at the University of Cambridge in England, where he worked under the supervision of Ralph Fowler. At the request of Patrick Blackett, who was working with cloud chambers, Bethe created a relativistic version of the Bethe formula.

Bethe was known for his sense of humor, and with Guido Beck and Wolfgang Riezler, two other postdoctoral research fellows, created a hoax paper On the Quantum Theory of the Temperature of Absolute Zero where he calculated the fine structure constant from the absolute zero temperature in Celsius units. The paper poked fun at a certain class of papers in theoretical physics of the day, which were purely speculative and based on spurious numerical arguments, such as Arthur Eddington's attempts to explain the value of the fine structure constant from fundamental quantities in an earlier paper. They were forced to issue an apology.

For the second half of his scholarship, Bethe chose to go to Enrico Fermi's laboratory in Rome in February 1931. He was greatly impressed by Fermi and regretted that he had not gone to Rome first. Bethe developed the Bethe ansatz, a method for finding the exact solutions for the eigenvalues and eigenvectors of certain one-dimensional quantum many-body models. He was influenced by Fermi's simplicity and Sommerfeld's rigor in approaching problems and these qualities influenced his own later research.

The Rockefeller Foundation offered an extension of Bethe's fellowship, allowing him to return to Italy in 1932. In the meantime, Bethe worked for Sommerfeld at the Ludwig-Maximilians-Universität München as a privatdozent. Since Bethe was fluent in English, Sommerfeld had Bethe supervise all his English-speaking postdoctoral fellows, including Lloyd P. Smith from Cornell University. Bethe accepted a request from Karl Scheel to write an article for the Handbuch der Physik on the quantum mechanics of hydrogen and helium. Reviewing the article decades later, Robert Bacher and Victor Weisskopf noted that it was unusual in the depth and breadth of its treatment of the subject that required very little updating for the 1959 edition. Bethe was then asked by Sommerfeld to help him with the handbuch article on electrons in metals. The article covered the basis of what is now called solid state physics. Bethe took a very new field and provided a clear, coherent, and complete coverage of it. His work on the handbuch articles occupied most of his time in Rome, but he also co-wrote a paper with Fermi on another new field, quantum electrodynamics, describing the relativistic interactions of charged particles.

In 1932, Bethe accepted an appointment as an assistant professor at the University of Tübingen, where Hans Geiger was the professor of experimental physics. One of the first laws passed by the new Nazi government was the Law for the Restoration of the Professional Civil Service. Due to his Jewish background, Bethe was dismissed from his job at the university, which was a government post. Geiger refused to help, but Sommerfeld immediately gave Bethe back his fellowship at the Ludwig-Maximilians-Universität München. Sommerfeld spent much of the summer term of 1933 finding places for Jewish students and colleagues.

Bethe left Germany in 1933, moving to England after receiving an offer for a position as lecturer at the University of Manchester for a year through Sommerfeld's connection to William Lawrence Bragg. He moved in with his friend Rudolf Peierls and Peierls' wife Genia. Peierls was a fellow German physicist who had also been barred from academic positions in Germany because he was Jewish. This meant that Bethe had someone to speak to in German and he did not have to eat English food. Their relationship was professional as well as personal. Peierls aroused Bethe's interest in nuclear physics. After James Chadwick and Maurice Goldhaber discovered the photodisintegration of deuterium, Chadwick challenged Bethe and Peierls to come up with a theoretical explanation of this phenomenon. This they did on the four-hour train ride from Cambridge back to Manchester. Bethe would investigate further in the years ahead.

In 1933, the physics department at Cornell University, New York, was looking for a new theoretical physicist, and Lloyd Smith strongly recommended Bethe. This was supported by Bragg, who was visiting Cornell at the time. In August 1934, Cornell offered Bethe a position as an acting assistant professor. Bethe had already accepted a fellowship for a year to work with Nevill Mott at the University of Bristol for a semester, but Cornell agreed to let him start in the spring of 1935. Before leaving for the United States, he visited the Niels Bohr Institute in Copenhagen in September 1934, where he proposed to Hilde Levi, who accepted. The match was opposed by Bethe's mother, who despite having a Jewish background, did not want him to marry a Jewish woman. A few days before their wedding date in December, Bethe broke off their engagement. Niels Bohr and James Franck were so shocked by this action by Bethe that he was not invited to the institute again until after World War II.

== United States ==
Bethe arrived in the United States in February 1935, and joined the faculty at Cornell University on a salary of $3,000. Bethe's appointment was part of a deliberate effort on the part of the new head of its physics department, Roswell Clifton Gibbs, to move into nuclear physics. Gibbs had hired Stanley Livingston, who had worked with Ernest Lawrence, to build a cyclotron at Cornell. To complete the team, Cornell needed an experimentalist, and, on the advice of Bethe and Livingston, recruited Robert Bacher. Bethe received requests to visit Columbia University from Isidor Isaac Rabi, Princeton University from Edward Condon, University of Rochester from Lee DuBridge, Purdue University from Karl Lark-Horovitz, the University of Illinois at Urbana–Champaign from Francis Wheeler Loomis, and Harvard University from John Hasbrouck Van Vleck. Gibbs moved to prevent Bethe from being poached by having him appointed as a regular assistant professor in 1936, with an assurance that promotion to professor would soon follow.

Together with Bacher and Livingston, Bethe published a series of three articles, which summarized most of what was known on the subject of nuclear physics until that time, an account that became known informally as "Bethe's Bible". It remained the standard work on the subject for many years. In this account, he also continued where others left off, filling in gaps in the older literature. Loomis offered Bethe a full professorship at the University of Illinois at Urbana–Champaign, but Cornell matched the position offered, and the salary of $6,000. He wrote to his mother:

I am about the leading theoretician in America. That does not mean the best. Wigner is certainly better and Oppenheimer and Teller probably just as good. But I do more and talk more and that counts too.

Illustration of the proton–proton chain reaction sequence

Overview of the CNO-I cycle – the helium nucleus is released at the top-left step

On March 17, 1938, Bethe attended the Carnegie Institute and George Washington University's fourth annual Washington Conference on Theoretical Physics. There were only 34 invited attendees, but they included Gregory Breit, Subrahmanyan Chandrasekhar, George Gamow, Donald Menzel, John von Neumann, Bengt Strömgren, Edward Teller, and Merle Tuve. Bethe initially declined the invitation to attend, because the conference's topic, stellar energy generation, did not interest him, but Teller persuaded him to go. At the conference, Strömgren detailed what was known about the temperature, density, and chemical composition of the Sun, and challenged the physicists to come up with an explanation. Gamow and Carl Friedrich von Weizsäcker had proposed in a 1937 paper that the Sun's energy was the result of a proton–proton chain reaction:

p	+	p	→	^{2}_{1}D	+	e^{+}	+	ν_{e}

But this did not account for the observation of elements heavier than helium. By the end of the conference, Bethe, working in collaboration with Charles Critchfield, had come up with a series of subsequent nuclear reactions that explained how the Sun shines:

^{2}_{1}D	+	p	→	^{3}_{2}He	+	γ
^{3}_{2}He	+	^{4}_{2}He	→	^{7}_{4}Be	+	γ
^{7}_{4}Be	+	e^{−}	→	^{7}_{3}Li	+	ν_{e}
^{7}_{3}Li	+	p	→	2 ^{4}_{2}He

That this did not explain the processes in heavier stars was not overlooked. At the time there were doubts about whether the proton–proton cycle described the processes in the Sun, but more recent measurements of the Sun's core temperature and luminosity show that it does. When he returned to Cornell, Bethe studied the relevant nuclear reactions and reaction cross sections, leading to his discovery of the carbon-nitrogen-oxygen cycle (CNO cycle):

^{12}_{6}C	+	p	→	^{13}_{7}N	+	γ
^{13}_{7}N			→	^{13}_{6}C	+	e^{+}	+	ν_{e}
^{13}_{6}C	+	p	→	^{14}_{7}N	+	γ
^{14}_{7}N	+	p	→	^{15}_{8}O	+	γ
^{15}_{8}O			→	^{15}_{7}N	+	e^{+}	+	ν_{e}
^{15}_{7}N	+	p	→	^{12}_{6}C	+	^{4}_{2}He

The two papers, one on the proton–proton cycle, co-authored with Critchfield, and the other on the carbon-oxygen-nitrogen (CNO) cycle, were sent to the Physical Review for publication.

After Kristallnacht, Bethe's mother had become afraid to remain in Germany. Taking advantage of her Strasbourg origin, she was able to emigrate to the United States in June 1939 on the French quota, rather than the German one, which was full. Bethe's graduate student Robert Marshak noted that the New York Academy of Sciences was offering a $500 prize for the best unpublished paper on the topic of solar and stellar energy. So Bethe, in need of $250 to release his mother's furniture, withdrew the CNO cycle paper and sent it in to the New York Academy of Sciences. It won the prize, and Bethe gave Marshak $50 finder's fee and used $250 to release his mother's furniture. The paper was subsequently published in the Physical Review in March. It was a breakthrough in the understanding of the stars, and would win Bethe the Nobel Prize in Physics in 1967. In 2002, at age 96, Bethe sent a handwritten note to John N. Bahcall congratulating him on the use of solar neutrino observations to show that the CNO cycle accounts for approximately 7% of the Sun's energy; the neutrino observations had started with Raymond Davis Jr., whose experiment was based on Bahcall's calculations and encouragement, and the note led to Davis's receiving a share of the 2002 Nobel Prize.

Bethe married Rose Ewald, the daughter of Paul Ewald, on September 13, 1939, in a simple civil ceremony. She had emigrated to the United States and was a student at Duke University and they met while Bethe was lecturing there in 1937. They had two children, Henry and Monica. (Henry was a contract bridge expert and former husband of Kitty Munson Cooper.)

Bethe became a naturalized citizen of the United States in March 1941. Writing to Sommerfeld in 1947, Bethe confided that "I am much more at home in America than I ever was in Germany. As if I was born in Germany only by mistake, and only came to my true homeland at 28."

== Manhattan Project ==
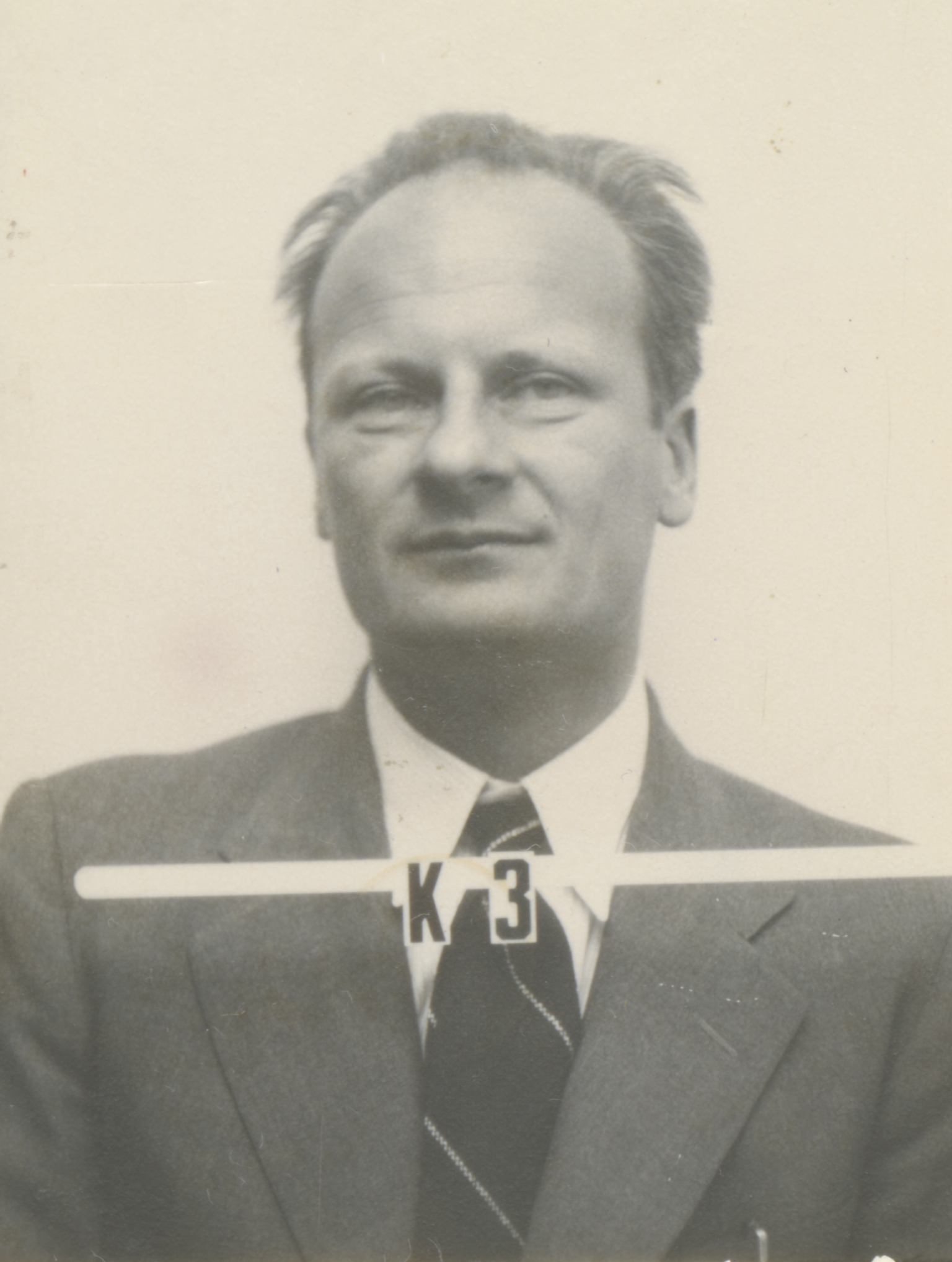
Bethe's Los Alamos Laboratory ID badge

When the Second World War began, Bethe wanted to contribute to the war effort, but was unable to work on classified projects until he became a citizen. Following the advice of the Caltech aerodynamicist Theodore von Kármán, Bethe collaborated with his friend Edward Teller on a theory of shock waves that are generated by the passage of a projectile through a gas. Bethe considered it one of their most influential papers. He also worked on a theory of armor penetration, which was immediately classified by the army, thus making it impossible for Bethe (who was not an American citizen at the time) to access further research on the theory.

After receiving security clearance in December 1941, Bethe joined the MIT Radiation Laboratory, where he invented the Bethe-hole directional coupler, which is used in microwave waveguides such as those used in radar sets. In Chicago in June 1942, and then in July at the University of California, Berkeley, he participated in a series of meetings at the invitation of Robert Oppenheimer, which discussed the first designs for the atomic bomb. They went over the preliminary calculations by Robert Serber, Stan Frankel, and others, and discussed the possibilities of using uranium-235 and plutonium. (Teller then raised the prospect of a thermonuclear device, Teller's "Super" bomb. At one point Teller asked if the nitrogen in the atmosphere could be set alight. It fell to Bethe and Emil Konopinski to perform the calculations demonstrating the virtual impossibility of such an occurrence.) "The fission bomb had to be done," he later recalled, "because the Germans were presumably doing it."

When Oppenheimer was put in charge of forming a secret weapons design laboratory, Los Alamos, he appointed Bethe director of the T (Theoretical) Division, the laboratory's smallest, but most prestigious division. This move irked the equally qualified, but more difficult to manage Teller and Felix Bloch, who had coveted the job. A series of disagreements between Bethe and Teller between February and June 1944 over the relative priority of Super research led to Teller's group being removed from T Division and placed directly under Oppenheimer. In September it became part of Fermi's new F Division.

Bethe's work at Los Alamos included calculating the critical mass and efficiency of uranium-235 and the multiplication of nuclear fission in an exploding atomic bomb. Along with Richard Feynman, he developed a formula for calculating the bomb's explosive yield. After August 1944, when the laboratory was reorganized and reoriented to solve the problem of the implosion of the plutonium bomb, Bethe spent much of his time studying the hydrodynamic aspects of implosion, a job that he continued into 1944. In 1945, he worked on the neutron initiator, and later, on radiation propagation from an exploding atomic bomb. The Trinity nuclear test validated the accuracy of T Division's results. When it was detonated in the New Mexico desert on July 16, 1945, Bethe's immediate concern was for its efficient operation, and not its moral implications. He is reported to have commented: "I am not a philosopher."

== Hydrogen bomb ==
After the war, Bethe argued that a crash project for the hydrogen bomb should not be attempted, nevertheless after President Harry Truman announced the beginning of such a project and the outbreak of the Korean War, Bethe signed up and played a key role in the weapon's development. Although he saw the project through to its end, Bethe had hoped that it would be impossible to create the hydrogen bomb. He later remarked in 1968 on the apparent contradiction in his stance, having first opposed the development of the weapon and later helping to create it:

Just a few months before, the Korean war had broken out, and for the first time I saw direct confrontation with the communists. It was too disturbing. The cold war looked as if it were about to get hot. I knew then I had to reverse my earlier position. If I did not work on the bomb, somebody else would—and I had thought if I were around Los Alamos I might still be a force for disarmament. So I agreed to join in developing the H-bomb. It seemed quite logical. But sometimes I wish I were a more consistent idealist.

As for his own role in the project and its relation to the dispute over who was responsible for the design, Bethe later said that:

After the H-bomb was made, reporters started to call Teller the father of the H-bomb. For the sake of history, I think it is more precise to say that Ulam is the father, because he provided the seed, and Teller is the mother, because he remained with the child. As for me, I guess I am the midwife.

In 1954, Bethe testified on behalf of J. Robert Oppenheimer during the Oppenheimer security hearing. Specifically, Bethe argued that Oppenheimer's stances against developing the hydrogen bomb in the late 1940s had not hindered its development, a topic which was seen as a key motivating factor behind the hearing. Bethe contended that the developments that led to the successful Teller–Ulam design were a matter of serendipity and not a question of manpower or logical development of previously existing ideas. During the hearing, Bethe and his wife also tried hard to persuade Edward Teller against testifying. However, Teller did not agree, and his testimony played a major role in the revocation of Oppenheimer's security clearance. While Bethe and Teller had been on very good terms during the prewar years, the conflict between them during the Manhattan Project, and especially during the Oppenheimer episode, permanently marred their relationship.

== Later work ==
=== Lamb shift ===
Hans Bethe lecturing at Dalhousie University, 1978

After the war ended, Bethe returned to Cornell. In June 1947, he participated in the Shelter Island Conference. Sponsored by the National Academy of Sciences and held at the Ram's Head Inn on Shelter Island, New York, the conference on the "Foundations of Quantum Mechanics" was the first major physics conference held after the war. It was a chance for American physicists to come together, pick up where they had left off before the war, and establish the direction of post-war research.

A major talking point at the conference was the discovery by Willis Lamb and his graduate student, Robert Retherford, shortly before the conference began that one of the two possible quantum states of hydrogen atoms had slightly more energy than that predicted by the theory of Paul Dirac; this became known as the Lamb shift. Oppenheimer and Weisskopf suggested that this was a result of quantum fluctuations of the electromagnetic field, which gave the electron more energy. According to pre-war quantum electrodynamics (QED), the energy of the electron consisted of the bare energy it had when uncoupled from an electromagnetic field, and the self-energy resulting from the electromagnetic coupling, but both were unobservable, since the electromagnetic field cannot be switched off. QED gave infinite values for the self-energies; but the Lamb shift showed that they were both real and finite. Hans Kramers proposed renormalization as a solution, but no one knew how to do the calculation.

Bethe managed to perform the calculation on the train from New York to Schenectady, where he was working for General Electric. He did so by realising that it was a non-relativistic process, which greatly simplified the calculation. The bare energy was easily removed as it was already included in the observed mass of the electron. The self energy term now increased logarithmically instead of linearly, making it mathematically convergent. Bethe arrived at a value for the Lamb shift of 1040 MHz, extremely close to that obtained experimentally by Lamb and Retherford. His paper, published in the Physical Review in August 1947, was only three pages long and contained just twelve mathematical equations, but was enormously influential. It had been presumed that the infinities indicated that QED was fundamentally flawed, and that a new, radical theory was required; Bethe demonstrated that this was not necessary.

His calculation of the Lamb shift has been called "the most important discovery in the history of the theory of quantum electrodynamics" by the physicist Richard Feynman, while physicist Paul Dirac called it "the most important calculation in physics for decades".

One of Bethe's most famous papers is one he never wrote: the 1948 Alpher–Bethe–Gamow paper. George Gamow added Bethe's name (in absentia) without consulting him, knowing that Bethe would not mind, and against Ralph Alpher's wishes. This was apparently a reflection of Gamow's sense of humor, wanting to have a paper title that would sound like the first three letters of the Greek alphabet. As one of the Physical Review's reviewers, Bethe saw the manuscript and struck out the words "in absentia".

=== Astrophysics ===
Bethe believed that the atomic nucleus was like a quantum liquid drop. He investigated the nuclear matter problem by considering the work conducted by Keith Brueckner on perturbation theory. Working with Jeffrey Goldstone, he produced a solution for the case where there was an infinite hard-core potential. Then, working with Baird Brandow and Albert Petschek, he came up with an approximation that converted the scattering equation into an easily solved differential equation. This then led him to the Bethe-Faddeev equation, a generalisation of Ludvig Faddeev's approach to three-body scattering. He then used these techniques to examine the neutron stars, which have densities similar to those of nuclei.

Bethe continued to do research on supernovae, neutron stars, black holes, and other problems in theoretical astrophysics into his late nineties. In doing this, he collaborated with Gerald E. Brown of Stony Brook University. In 1978, Brown proposed that they collaborate on supernovae. These were reasonably well understood by this time, but the calculations were still a problem. Using techniques honed from decades of working with nuclear physics, and some experience with calculations involving nuclear explosions, Bethe tackled the problems involved in stellar gravitational collapse, and the way in which various factors affected a supernova explosion. Once again, he was able to reduce the problem to a set of differential equations, and to solve them.

At age 85, Bethe wrote an important article about the solar neutrino problem, in which he helped establish the conversion mechanism for electron neutrinos into muon neutrinos proposed by Stanislav Mikheyev, Alexei Smirnov, and Lincoln Wolfenstein to explain a vexing discrepancy between theory and experiment. Bethe argued that physics beyond the Standard Model was required to understand the solar neutrino problem, because it presumed that neutrinos have no mass, and therefore, cannot metamorphosize into each other; whereas the MSW effect required this to occur. Bethe hoped that corroborating evidence would be found by the Sudbury Neutrino Observatory (SNO) in Ontario by his 90th birthday, but he did not get the call from SNO until June 2001, when he was nearly 95.

In 1996, Kip Thorne approached Bethe and Brown about LIGO, the Laser Interferometer Gravitational-Wave Observatory designed to detect the gravitational waves from merging neutron stars and black holes. Since Bethe and Brown were good at calculating things that could not be seen, could they look at the mergers? The 90-year-old Bethe quickly became enthused and soon began the required calculations. The result was a 1998 paper on the "Evolution of Binary Compact Objects Which Merge", which Brown regarded as the best that the two produced together.

== Political stances ==
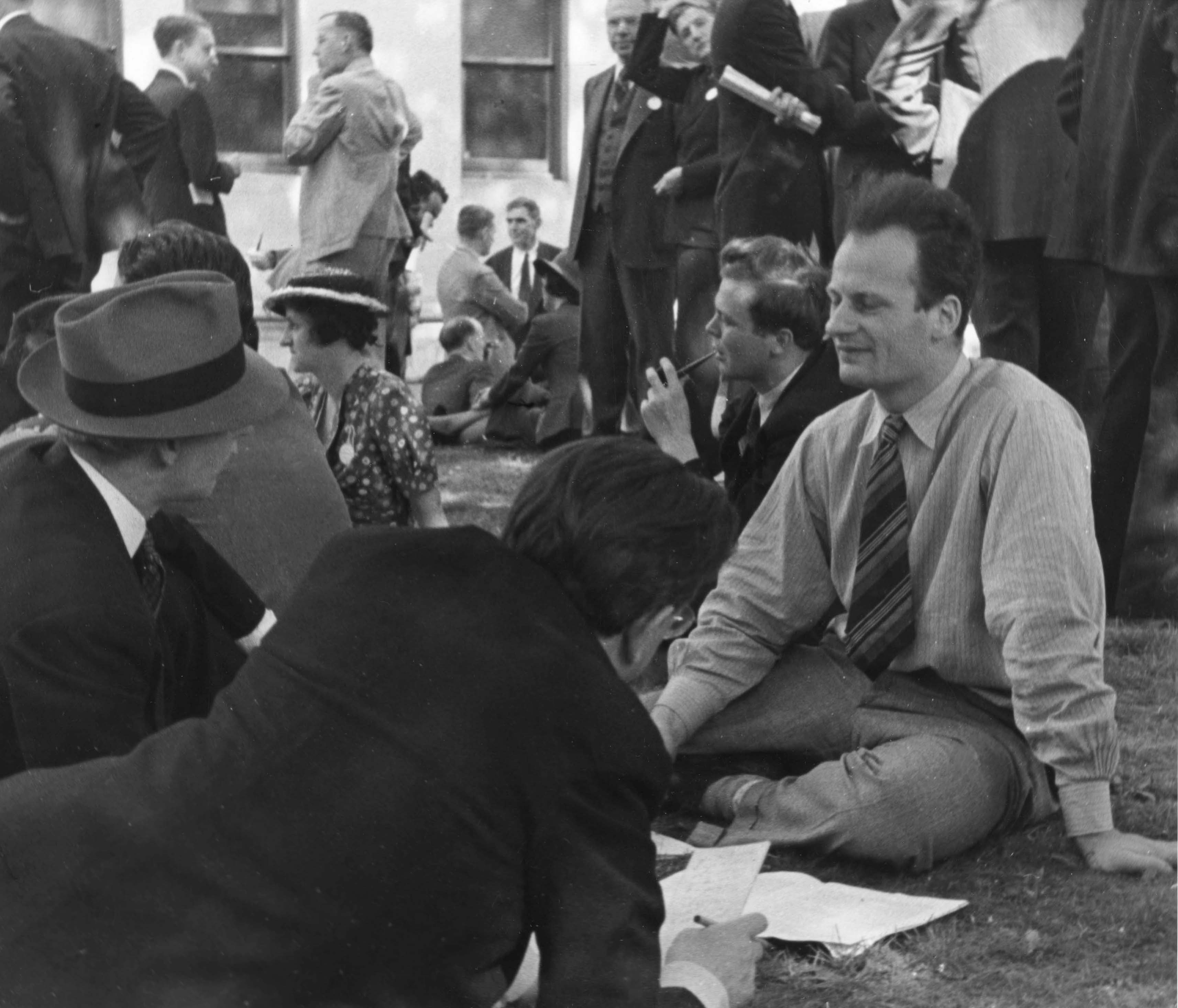
Bethe being interviewed by journalists

In 1968, Bethe, along with IBM physicist Richard Garwin, published an article criticising in detail the anti-ICBM defense system proposed by the Department of Defense. The two physicists described in the article that nearly any measure taken by the United States would be easily thwarted with the deployment of relatively simple decoys. Bethe was one of the primary voices in the scientific community behind the signing of the 1963 Partial Test Ban Treaty prohibiting further atmospheric testing of nuclear weapons.

During the 1980s and 1990s, Bethe campaigned for the peaceful use of nuclear energy. After the Chernobyl disaster, Bethe was part of a committee of experts who analysed the incident. They concluded that the reactor suffered from a fundamentally faulty design and also that human error had contributed significantly to the accident. "My colleagues and I established," he explained "that the Chernobyl disaster tells us about the deficiencies of the Soviet political and administrative system rather than about problems with nuclear power." Throughout his life Bethe remained a strong advocate for electricity from nuclear energy, which he described in 1977 as "a necessity, not merely an option."

In the 1980s he and other physicists opposed the Strategic Defense Initiative missile system conceived by the Ronald Reagan administration. In 1995, at the age of 88, Bethe wrote an open letter calling on all scientists to "cease and desist" from working on any aspect of nuclear weapons development and manufacture. In 2004, he joined 47 other Nobel laureates in signing a letter endorsing John Kerry for President of the United States as someone who would "restore science to its appropriate place in government".

Historian Gregg Herken wrote:

When Oppenheimer died, Oppie's long-time friend, Hans Bethe, assumed the mantle of the scientist of conscience in this country. Like Jefferson and Adams, Teller and Bethe would live on into the new century which they and their colleagues had done so much to shape.

== Personal life ==
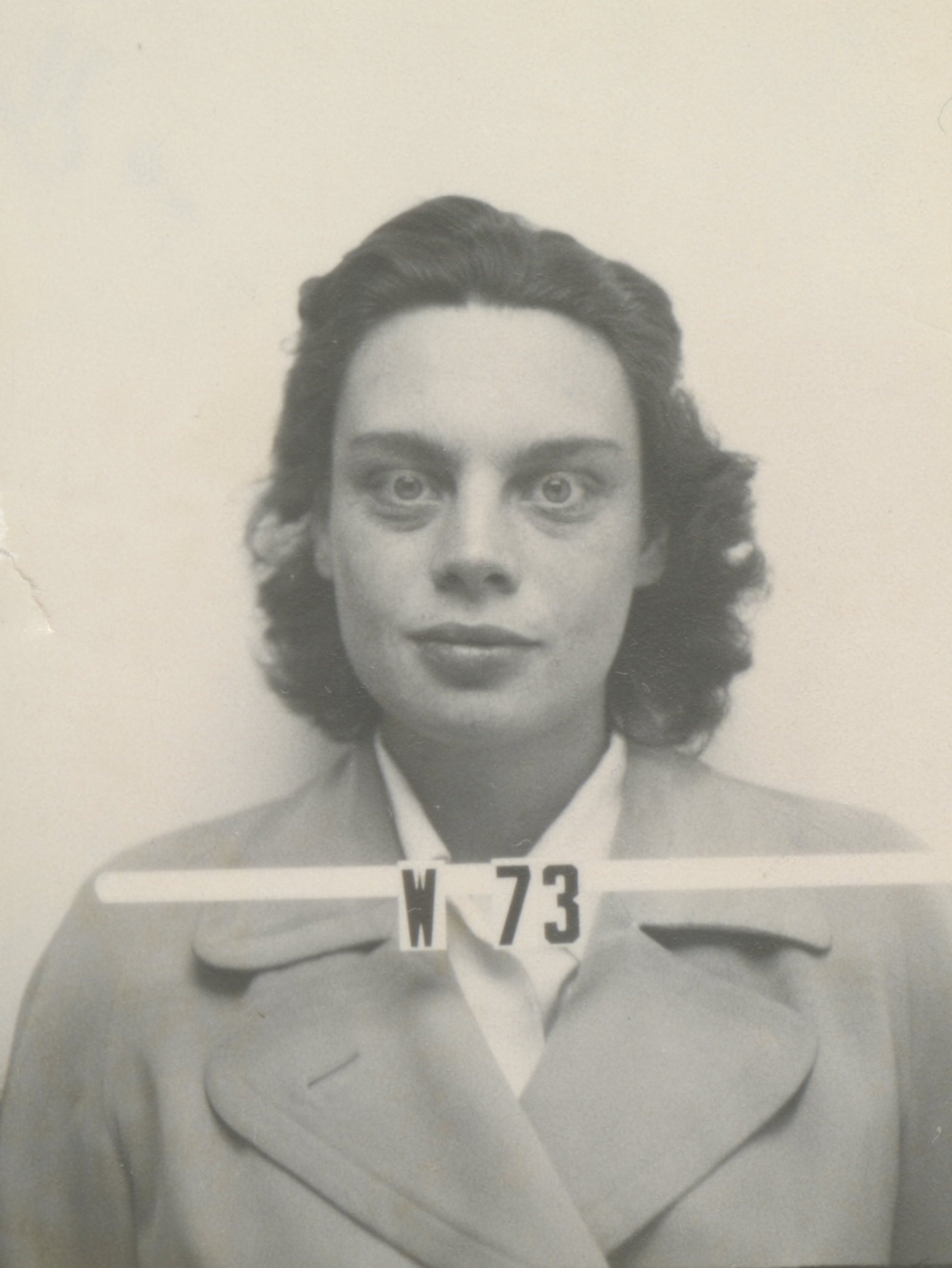
Rose Bethe Los Alamos badge

Bethe's hobbies included a passion for stamp-collecting. He loved the outdoors and was an enthusiastic hiker all his life, exploring the Alps and the Rockies. He died in his home in Ithaca, New York, on March 6, 2005, of congestive heart failure. He was survived by his wife, Rose Ewald Bethe, and their two children. At the time of his death, he was the John Wendell Anderson Professor of Physics, Emeritus, at Cornell University.

== Honors and awards ==
Bethe received numerous honors and awards in his lifetime and afterward. He became a Fellow of the American Academy of Arts and Sciences in 1947, and that year, he also received the National Academy of Sciences's Henry Draper Medal and was elected to the American Philosophical Society. He was awarded the Max Planck Medal in 1955, the Franklin Medal in 1959, the Royal Astronomical Society Eddington Medal and the United States Atomic Energy Commission Enrico Fermi Award in 1961, the Rumford Prize in 1963, the Nobel Prize in Physics in 1967, the National Medal of Science in 1975, the Oersted Medal in 1993, the Bruce Medal in 2001, and posthumously in 2005, the Benjamin Franklin Medal for Distinguished Achievement in the Sciences by the American Philosophical Society.

Bethe was elected Foreign Member of the Royal Society (ForMemRS) in 1957, and he gave the 1993 Bakerian Lecture at the Royal Society on the Mechanism of Supernovae. In 1978 he was elected a Member of the German Academy of Sciences Leopoldina.

Cornell named the third of five new residential colleges, each of which is named after a distinguished former member of the Cornell faculty, as the Hans Bethe House after him. Similarly named after him is the Hans Bethe Center, 322 Fourth Street NE, Washington, D.C., home to the Council for a Livable World, where Bethe was a longtime board member, as well as the Bethe Center for Theoretical Physics at University of Bonn in Germany. An asteroid, 30828 Bethe, that was discovered in 1990 was named after him. The American Physical Society Hans Bethe Prize was named after him as well.

Bethe's family donated his Nobel Prize medal to Cornell University in January 2022.

== Selected publications ==
- Bethe, H. A. "Theory of High Frequency Rectification by Silicon Crystals", Massachusetts Institute of Technology (MIT) Radiation Laboratory, United States Department of Energy (through predecessor agency the Atomic Energy Commission), (October 29, 1942).
- Bethe, H. A. "Theoretical Estimate of Maximum Possible Nuclear Explosion", Knolls Atomic Power Laboratory-Schenectady, N.Y., United States Department of Energy (through predecessor agency the Atomic Energy Commission), (January 31, 1950).
- Bethe, H. A.; Rajaraman, R. "Three-body Problem in Nuclear Matter", University of Southern California-Los Angeles, United States Department of Energy (through predecessor agency the Atomic Energy Commission), (1967).
- Bethe, H. A. "Note on Inverse Bremsstrahlung in a Strong Electromagnetic Field", Los Alamos National Laboratory (LANL), United States Department of Energy (through predecessor agency the Atomic Energy Commission), (September 1972).
- Bethe, H. A. "Pauli Principle and Pion Scattering", Los Alamos National Laboratory (LANL), United States Department of Energy (through predecessor agency the Atomic Energy Commission), (October 1972).
- Bethe, H. A. "Fusion Hybrid Reactor", Sandia National Laboratories, United States Department of Energy, (August 1981).
- Bethe, Hans (1928). Theorie der Beugung von Elektronen an Kristallen (Doctoral thesis).

== See also ==
- Hydrogen anion
- List of Jewish Nobel laureates
