= Momentum transfer =

Process of transferring momentum from one location to another

In particle physics, wave mechanics, and optics, momentum transfer is the amount of momentum that one particle gives to another particle. It is also called the scattering vector as it describes the transfer of wavevector in wave mechanics. In the simplest example of scattering of two colliding particles with initial momenta $\vec{p}_{i1},\vec{p}_{i2}$, resulting in final momenta $\vec{p}_{f1},\vec{p}_{f2}$, the momentum transfer is given by

$$\vec q = \vec{p}_{i1} - \vec{p}_{f1} = \vec{p}_{f2} - \vec{p}_{i2}$$

where the last identity expresses momentum conservation. Momentum transfer is an important quantity because $\Delta x = \hbar / |q|$ is a better measure for the typical distance resolution of the reaction than the momenta themselves.

== Wave mechanics and optics ==
A wave has a momentum $p = \hbar k$ and is a vectorial quantity. The difference in momentum of the scattered wave from the incident wave is called momentum transfer. The wave number k is the absolute of the wave vector $k = p / \hbar$ and is related to the wavelength $k = 2\pi / \lambda$. Momentum transfer is given in wavenumber units in reciprocal space $Q = k_f - k_i$.

=== Diffraction ===
The momentum transfer plays an important role in the evaluation of neutron, X-ray, and electron diffraction for the investigation of condensed matter. Laue-Bragg diffraction occurs on the atomic crystal lattice, conserves the wave energy and thus is called elastic scattering, where the wave numbers final and incident particles, $k_f$ and $k_i$, respectively, are equal and just the direction changes by a reciprocal lattice vector $G = Q = k_f - k_i$ with the relation to the lattice spacing $G = 2\pi / d$. As momentum is conserved, the transfer of momentum occurs to crystal momentum.

The presentation in reciprocal space is generic and does not depend on the type of radiation and wavelength used but only on the sample system, which allows to compare results obtained from many different methods. Some established communities such as powder diffraction employ the diffraction angle $2\theta$ as the independent variable, which worked fine in the early years when only a few characteristic wavelengths such as Cu-K$\alpha$ were available. The relationship to $Q$-space is

$$Q = 2 k \sin \left ( \theta \right )$$

with $k = {2 \pi }/{\lambda}$ and basically states that larger $2\theta$ corresponds to larger $Q$.

== See also ==
- Atomic form factor – Measure of the scattering amplitude of a wave by an isolated atom
- Mandelstam variables – Variables used in scattering processes
- Momentum-transfer cross section – Concept in scattering theory
- Impulse (physics) – Integral of a comparatively larger force over a short time interval
