= List of fellows of the Royal Society elected in 1957 =

This article lists fellows of the Royal Society elected in 1957.

== Fellows ==
1. Saul Adler
2. Emmanuel Amoroso
3. Charlotte Auerbach
4. George Batchelor
5. William Ernest Burcham
6. Frederick Dainton, Baron Dainton
7. James Danielli
8. Sir Fred Hoyle
9. John Kenyon Netherton Jones
10. Henry Lipson
11. Sir Leslie H. Martin
12. Sir John McMichael
13. Bruno Mendel
14. Cyril Leslie Oakley
15. Sir Harry Pitt
16. Francis Leslie Rose
17. Sir William Kershaw Slater
18. Sir Frank Ewart Smith
19. Ernest Lester Smith
20. Herbert Squire
21. Frederick Campion Steward
22. Walter Stanley Stiles
23. Reginald Sutcliffe
24. Darashaw Nosherwan Wadia
25. Alexander Watt
26. Walter Frederick Whittard

== Foreign members ==
1. Hans Bethe
2. Albert Frey-Wyssling
3. Otto Hahn
4. Arne Tiselius

== Statute 12 fellow ==
1. Robert Gascoyne-Cecil, 5th Marquess of Salisbury
