= Mott polynomials =

In mathematics the Mott polynomials s_{n}(x) are polynomials given by the exponential generating function:

$$e^{x(\sqrt{1-t^2}-1)/t}=\sum_n s_n(x) t^n/n!.$$

== Introduction ==
They were introduced by Nevill Francis Mott who applied them to a problem in the theory of electrons.

== Logic ==
Because the factor in the exponential has the power series

$$\frac{\sqrt{1-t^2}-1}{t} = -\sum_{k\ge 0} C_k \left(\frac{t}{2}\right)^{2k+1}$$

in terms of Catalan numbers $C_k$, the coefficient in front of $x^k$ of the polynomial can be written as

$[x^k] s_n(x) =(-1)^k\frac{n!}{k!2^n}\sum_{n=l_1+l_2+\cdots +l_k}C_{(l_1-1)/2}C_{(l_2-1)/2}\cdots C_{(l_k-1)/2}$, according to the general formula for generalized Appell polynomials, where the sum is over all compositions $n=l_1+l_2+\cdots+l_k$ of $n$ into $k$ positive odd integers. The empty product appearing for $k=n=0$ equals 1. Special values, where all contributing Catalan numbers equal 1, are
$$[x^n]s_n(x) = \frac{(-1)^n}{2^n}.$$
$$[x^{n-2}]s_n(x) = \frac{(-1)^n n(n-1)(n-2)}{2^n}.$$

By differentiation the recurrence for the first derivative becomes

$$s'(x) =- \sum_{k=0}^{\lfloor (n-1)/2\rfloor} \frac{n!}{(n-1-2k)!2^{2k+1}} C_k s_{n-1-2k}(x).$$

The first few of them are (sequence A137378 in the OEIS)

$$s_0(x)=1;$$
$$s_1(x)=-\frac{1}{2}x;$$
$$s_2(x)=\frac{1}{4}x^2;$$
$$s_3(x)=-\frac{3}{4}x-\frac{1}{8}x^3;$$
$$s_4(x)=\frac{3}{2}x^2+\frac{1}{16}x^4;$$
$$s_5(x)=-\frac{15}{2}x-\frac{15}{8}x^3-\frac{1}{32}x^5;$$
$$s_6(x)=\frac{225}{8}x^2+\frac{15}{8}x^4+\frac{1}{64}x^6;$$

== Sheffer sequence ==
The polynomials s_{n}(x) form the associated Sheffer sequence for –2t/(1–t^{2})

== Generalized hypergeometric function ==
An explicit expression for them in terms of the generalized hypergeometric function _{3}F_{0}:

$$s_n(x)=(-x/2)^n{}_3F_0(-n,\frac{1-n}{2},1-\frac{n}{2};;-\frac{4}{x^2})$$
