= David Breed Beard =

American physicist

- Born: 1 February 1922; Needham, Massachusetts, US
- Died: 21 January 1998 (aged 75)
- Education: Cornell University; Hamilton College
- Scientific career
- Fields: Space physics
- Workplaces: University of Kansas; UC Davis
- Doctoral advisor: Hans Bethe

David Breed Beard (1 February 1922, Needham, Massachusetts – 21 January 1998, Portland, Maine) was a space physicist, known for "pioneering work on the shapes and structures of planetary magnetospheres, Jovian radio emissions, and comets."

After serving in the U.S. Navy during WWII, Beard graduated with a bachelor's degree from Hamilton College. He spent a year as a graduate student at Caltech, but then worked at the Naval Research Laboratory in Washington DC. He became a graduate student in physics at Cornell University and graduated there in 1951 with a PhD under the supervision of Hans Bethe. Beard was from 1951 to 1953 a member of the faculty of the University of Connecticut, with a sabbatical year at Oak Ridge National Laboratory, and from 1953 to 1956 an assistant professor at University of California, Davis. He worked from 1954 to 1957 at the University of California Radiation Laboratory at Livermore and from 1956 to 1958 at Lockheed Aircraft Corporation. He was a professor from 1959 to 1964 at the University of California, Davis and from 1964 to 1987 at the University of Kansas, where he retired as professor emeritus.

His 1964 paper "Shape of the Geomagnetic Field Solar Wind Boundary", written with Gilbert Mead, has been cited over 300 times.

Other contributions were focused on the Earth's magnetotail, Jupiter's magnetopause boundary, and the shape of Mercury's magnetosphere. Beard and his students provided some of the early calculations on Jupiter's synchrotron radiation, the interactions of comets with the solar wind, the zodiacal light, and the solar K and F coronae.

From 1965 to 1966 Beard was both a Fulbright Senior Research Scholar and a Guggenheim Fellow at Imperial College, London. There he was again a visiting scientist in 1972 as a NATO Senior Fellow. He was the author or coauthor of two books and about 80 scientific publications.

== Selected publications ==
- Beard, David Breed (1957). "The Atomic Nucleus". American Scientist. 45 (4): 333–342. JSTOR 27826952. 1957
- Beard, David B. (1959). "Cyclotron Radiation from Magnetically Confined Plasmas". Physics of Fluids. 2 (4): 379–389. Bibcode:1959PhFl....2..379B. doi:10.1063/1.1724407. 1959
- Beard, David B. (1959). "Interplanetary Dust Distribution". The Astrophysical Journal. 129: 496. Bibcode:1959ApJ...129..496B. doi:10.1086/146644. 1959
- Beard, David B.; Johnson, Francis S. (1960). "Charge and magnetic field interaction with satellites". Journal of Geophysical Research. 65: 1–8. Bibcode:1960JGR....65....1B. doi:10.1029/JZ065i001p00001. 1960
- Beard, David B. (1960). "The interaction of the terrestrial magnetic field with the solar corpuscular radiation". Journal of Geophysical Research. 65 (11): 3559–3568. Bibcode:1960JGR....65.3559B. doi:10.1029/JZ065i011p03559. 1960
- Beard, David B.; Johnson, Francis S. (1961). "Ionospheric limitations on attainable satellite potential". Journal of Geophysical Research. 66 (12): 4113–4122. Bibcode:1961JGR....66.4113B. doi:10.1029/JZ066i012p04113. 1961
- Beard, David B. (1962). "The interaction of the terrestrial magnetic field with the solar corpuscular radiation: 2. Second-order approximation". Journal of Geophysical Research. 67 (2): 477–483. Bibcode:1962JGR....67..477B. doi:10.1029/JZ067i002p00477. 1962
- Beard, David B. (1964). "The solar wind geomagnetic field boundary". Reviews of Geophysics. 2 (2): 335–365. Bibcode:1964RvGSP...2..335B. doi:10.1029/RG002i002p00335. OSTI 4880302. 1964
- Baker, John C.; Beard, David B.; Young, John C. (1964). "Self-Consistent Method for Determining the Boundary Shape between a Plasma and a Magnetic Field". Physics of Fluids. 7 (4): 504. Bibcode:1964PhFl....7..504B. doi:10.1063/1.1711230. 1964
- Beard, David B. (1966). "The theory of type I comet tails". Planetary and Space Science. 14 (4): 303–311. Bibcode:1966P&SS...14..303B. doi:10.1016/0032-0633(66)90069-9. 1966
- Bird, Michael K.; Beard, David B. (1972). "The self-consistent geomagnetic tail under static conditions". Planetary and Space Science. 20 (12): 2057–2072. Bibcode:1972P&SS...20.2057B. doi:10.1016/0032-0633(72)90062-1. 1972
- Choe, Joon Y.; Beard, David B.; Sullivan, Edward C. (1973). "Precise calculation of the magnetosphere surface for a tilted dipole". Planetary and Space Science. 21 (3): 485–498. Bibcode:1973P&SS...21..485C. doi:10.1016/0032-0633(73)90045-7. 1973
- Choe, J.Y.; Beard, D.B. (1974). "The compressed geomagnetic field as a function of dipole tilt". Planetary and Space Science. 22 (4): 595–608. Bibcode:1974P&SS...22..595C. doi:10.1016/0032-0633(74)90093-2. 1974
- Jackson, Donald J.; Beard, David B. (1977). "The magnetic field of Mercury". Journal of Geophysical Research. 82 (19): 2828–2836. Bibcode:1977JGR....82.2828J. doi:10.1029/JA082i019p02828. 1977
- Beard, David B. (1979). "The magnetotail magnetic field". Journal of Geophysical Research. 84 (A5): 2118–2122. Bibcode:1979JGR....84.2118B. doi:10.1029/JA084iA05p02118. 1979
- Engle, Irene M.; Beard, David B. (1980). "Idealized Jovian magnetosphere shape and field". Journal of Geophysical Research. 85 (A2): 579. Bibcode:1980JGR....85..579E. doi:10.1029/JA085iA02p00579. 1980
- Beard, David B.; Hirschi, Dean; Propp, Keith (1982). "The tailward magnetopause field beyond 10 R_{E}". Journal of Geophysical Research. 87 (A4): 2533. Bibcode:1982JGR....87.2533B. doi:10.1029/JA087iA04p02533. 1982
- Propp, Keith; Beard, D. B. (1984). "Cross-tail ion drift in a realistic model magnetotail". Journal of Geophysical Research. 89 (A12) 11013. Bibcode:1984JGR....8911013P. doi:10.1029/JA089iA12p11013. 1984
