= Mott–Schottky plot =

Term in semiconductor electrochemistry

In semiconductor electrochemistry, a Mott–Schottky plot describes the reciprocal of the square of capacitance $(1/C^2)$ versus the potential difference between bulk semiconductor and bulk electrolyte. In many theories, and in many experimental measurements, the plot is linear. The use of Mott–Schottky plots to determine system properties (such as flatband potential, doping density or Helmholtz capacitance) is termed Mott–Schottky analysis.

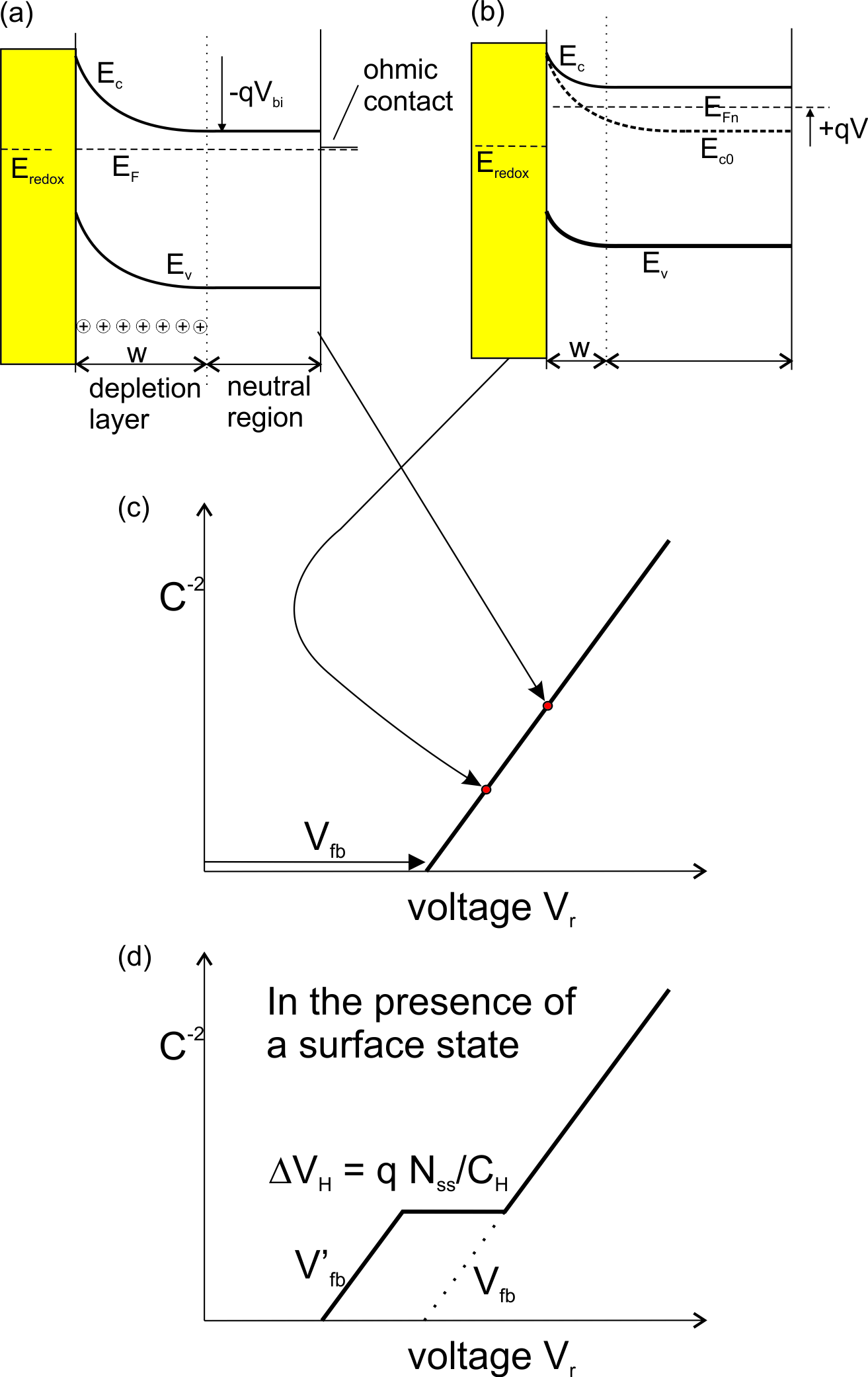
Figure 1. (a) Shows an energy diagram of n-type semiconductor in contact with redox electrolyte at the left side (yellow), and with a metallic ohmic contact at the right side. E_{c} is the conduction band edge energy, E_{v} is the valence band energy of the semiconductor. By equilibration of the Fermi level in the semiconductor, E_{F}, and the redox energy of electrolyte, E_{redox}, a Schottky barrier is formed at the semiconductor/electrolyte interface. The vertical size of the barrier in the energy diagram corresponds to the built-in potential V_{bi}. In the spatial axis the equilibration of Fermi levels produces a space charge region or depletion region of size w. A positive voltage applied to the back contact in (b) raises the Fermi level of electrons E_{Fn}, and decreases the size of the depletion region. Consequently, the capacitance of the junction increases, and the reciprocal square capacitance decreases forming a linear Mott–Schottky plot in (c). The intercept with the x-axis shows the flatband situation, that reveals the built-in potential, depending on the reference of voltage in the electrolyte side. (d) In the presence of a surface state of density N_{ss}, when the Fermi level reaches the bandgap state level, it is discharged and a plateau occurs depending on the value of the Helmholtz layer capacitance C_{H} at the electrolyte side of the junction. When the surface state is charged the Mott–Schottky lines continues, but the flatband potential is modified according to the extent of unpinning of the Fermi level. Adapted from

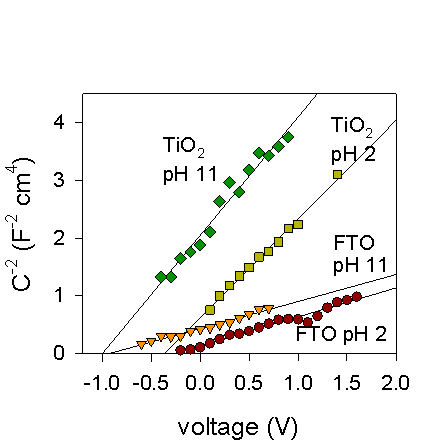
Figure 2. Mott–Schottky plot of a fluorine-doped tin oxide (FTO) semiconductor electrode measured in aqueous electrolyte at different pH, with respect to standard Ag/AgCl electrode. Changing the pH modifies the apparent flatband potential by 570 mV corresponding to a 59 mV displacement per unit of pH. From the slope the donor density N_{D} = 1.1 × 10^{21} cm^{−3} is determined. Then the same sample is measured after nanostructured TiO_{2} is deposited on top of FTO. The observed change of slope is due to the decrease of the surface in direct contact with the electrolyte.

Consider the semiconductor/electrolyte junction shown in Figure 1. Under applied bias voltage $V$ the size of the depletion layer $w$ is

$w={\left\lbrack \frac{2\varepsilon }{{\mathit{q}}{\mathit{N}}_{D}}\left(V+{V}_{\text{bi}}\right)\right\rbrack }^{1/2}$ (1)

Here $\varepsilon=\varepsilon_r \varepsilon_0$ is the permittivity, $q$ is the elementary charge, ${N}_{D}$ is the doping density, ${V}_{\text{bi}}$ is the built-in potential.

The depletion region contains positive charge compensated by ionic negative charge at the semiconductor surface (in the liquid electrolyte side). Charge separation forms a dielectric capacitor at the interface of the metal/semiconductor contact. We calculate the capacitance for an electrode area $A$ as

$C=\frac{\partial Q}{\partial V}={\mathit{q}}{\mathit{N}}_{D}A\frac{\partial w}{\partial V}$ (2)

replacing $\frac{\partial w}{\partial V}$ as obtained from equation 1, the result of the capacitance per unit area is

$C=A\frac{\varepsilon }{w}$ (3)

a equation describing the capacitance of a capacitor constructed of two parallel plates both of area $A$ separated by a distance $w$.

Replacing equation (3) in (1) we obtain the result

${C}^{-2}=\frac{2}{{\mathit{qA}}^{2}{\mathit{\varepsilon N}}_{D}}\left(V+{V}_{\text{bi}}\right)$ (4).

Therefore, a representation of the reciprocal square capacitance, is a linear function of the voltage, which constitutes the Mott–Schottky plot as shown in Fig. 1c. The measurement of the Mott–Schottky plot brings us two important pieces of information.

1. The slope gives the doping (semiconductor) density (provided that the dielectric constant is known).
2. The intercept to the x axis provides the built-in potential, or the flatband potential (as here the surface barrier has been flattened) and allows establishing the semiconductor conduction band level with respect to the reference of potential.

In liquid junction the reference of potential is normally a standard reference electrode. In solid junctions, we can take as a reference the metal Fermi level, if the work function is known, which provides a full energy diagram in the physical scale. The Mott–Schottky plot is sensitive to the electrode surface in contact with solution, see Figure 2.

A more accurate analysis considering the statistics of electrons provides the following result for the size of the depletion region

$w={\left\lbrack \frac{2\varepsilon }{{\mathit{qN}}_{D}}\left({V}_{\text{bi}}+V-\frac{{k}_{B}T}{q}\right)\right\rbrack }^{1/2}$(5)

in this case the Mott–Schottky equation is

${C}^{-2}=\frac{2}{{\mathit{qA}}^{2}{\mathit{\varepsilon N}}_{D}}\left({V}_{\text{bi}}+V-\frac{{k}_{B}T}{q}\right)$(6)

When the interfacial barrier is of the order ${k}_{B}T$, special care has to be taken to interpret the capacitance measurement. In fact at these small voltages the capacitance makes a peak that can be used for the determination of the built-in voltage.

The Mott–Schottky analysis can more generally resolve a variable doping profile in the semiconductor as follows

$\frac{d\left({C}^{-2}\right)}{\text{d}\mathit{V}}=\frac{2}{{\mathit{qA}}^{2}{\mathit{\varepsilon N}}_{D}\left(w\right)}$(7)

The derivative gives the doping at the edge of the depletion region, ${N}_{D}\left(w\right)$. This method only provides a spatial resolution of the order of a Debye length ${\lambda }_{D}$. In systems where more than one process gives a substantial kinetic response, it is necessary to adopt electrochemical impedance spectroscopy to resolve the different capacitances in the system. For example, in the presence of a surface state at the semiconductor/electrolyte interface, the spectra show two arcs, one at low frequency and another one at high frequency. The depletion capacitance leading to Mott–Schottky plot is situated in the high frequency arc, as the depletion capacitance is a dielectric capacitance. On the other hand, the low frequency feature corresponds to the chemical capacitance of the surface states. The surface state charging produces a plateau as indicated in Fig. 1d. Similarly, defect levels in the gap affect the changes of capacitance and conductance.

Another widely used method to scan deep levels in Schottky barriers is termed admittance spectroscopy and consists on measuring the capacitance at a fixed frequency while varying the temperature.

Surface photovoltage technique or potentiostatically induced Burstein-Moss shifts can be used to determine the position of the band edges.
