= Mott–Schottky equation =

The Mott–Schottky equation relates the capacitance to the applied voltage across a semiconductor-electrolyte junction.

$\frac{1}{C^2} = \frac{2}{\epsilon \epsilon_0 A^2 e N_d} (V - V_{fb} - \frac{k_B T}{e})$

where $C$ is the differential capacitance $\frac{\partial{Q}}{\partial{V}}$, $\epsilon$ is the dielectric constant of the semiconductor, $\epsilon_0$ is the permittivity of free space, $A$ is the area such that the depletion region volume is $w A$, $e$ is the elementary charge, $N_d$ is the density of dopants, $V$ is the applied potential, $V_{fb}$ is the flat band potential, $k_B$ is the Boltzmann constant, and T is the absolute temperature.

This theory predicts that a Mott–Schottky plot will be linear. The doping density $N_d$ can be derived from the slope of the plot (provided the area and dielectric constant are known). The flatband potential can be determined as well; absent the temperature term, the plot would cross the $V$-axis at the flatband potential.

== Derivation ==
Under an applied potential $V$, the width of the depletion region is

$w = (\frac{2 \epsilon \epsilon_0}{e N_d} ( V - V_{fb} ) )^\frac{1}{2}$

Using the abrupt approximation, all charge carriers except the ionized dopants have left the depletion region, so the charge density in the depletion region is $e N_d$, and the total charge of the depletion region, compensated by opposite charge nearby in the electrolyte, is

$Q = e N_d A w = e N_d A (\frac{2 \epsilon \epsilon_0}{e N_d} ( V - V_{fb} ) )^\frac{1}{2}$

Thus, the differential capacitance is

$C = \frac{\partial{Q}}{\partial{V}} = e N_d A \frac{1}{2}(\frac{2 \epsilon \epsilon_0}{e N_d})^\frac{1}{2} ( V - V_{fb} )^{-\frac{1}{2}} = A (\frac{e N_d \epsilon \epsilon_0}{2(V - V_{fb})})^\frac{1}{2}$

which is equivalent to the Mott-Schottky equation, save for the temperature term. In fact the temperature term arises from a more careful analysis, which takes statistical mechanics into account by abandoning the abrupt approximation and solving the Poisson–Boltzmann equation for the charge density in the depletion region.
