= Momentum-transfer cross section =

Concept in scattering theory

In physics, and especially scattering theory, the momentum-transfer cross section (sometimes known as the momentum-transport cross section) is an effective scattering cross section useful for describing the average momentum transferred from a particle when it collides with a target. Essentially, it contains all the information about a scattering process necessary for calculating average momentum transfers but ignores other details about the scattering angle.

The momentum-transfer cross section $\sigma_{\mathrm{tr}}$ is defined in terms of an (azimuthally symmetric and momentum independent) differential cross section $\frac{\mathrm{d} \sigma}{\mathrm{d} \Omega} (\theta)$ by
$$\begin{align}
\sigma_{\mathrm{tr}} &= \int (1 - \cos \theta) \frac{\mathrm{d} \sigma}{\mathrm{d} \Omega} (\theta) \, \mathrm{d} \Omega \\
&= \iint   (1 - \cos \theta) \frac{\mathrm{d} \sigma}{\mathrm{d} \Omega} (\theta) \sin \theta \, \mathrm{d} \theta \, \mathrm{d} \phi.
\end{align}$$

The momentum-transfer cross section can be written in terms of the phase shifts from a partial wave analysis as $\sigma_{\mathrm{tr}} = \frac{4\pi}{k^2} \sum_{l=0}^\infty (l+1) \sin^2[\delta_{l+1}(k) - \delta_l(k)].$

== Explanation ==
The factor of $1 - \cos \theta$ arises as follows. Let the incoming particle be traveling along the $z$-axis with vector momentum $\vec{p}_\mathrm{in} = q \hat{z}.$

Suppose the particle scatters off the target with polar angle $\theta$ and azimuthal angle $\phi$ plane. Its new momentum is $\vec{p}_\mathrm{out} = q' \cos \theta \hat{z} + q' \sin \theta \cos \phi\hat{x} + q' \sin \theta \sin \phi\hat{y}.$

For collision to much heavier target than striking particle (ex: electron incident on the atom or ion), $q'\backsimeq q$ so $\vec{p}_\mathrm{out} \simeq q \cos \theta \hat{z} + q \sin \theta \cos \phi\hat{x} + q \sin \theta \sin \phi\hat{y}$

By conservation of momentum, the target has acquired momentum $\Delta \vec{p} = \vec{p}_\mathrm{in} - \vec{p}_\mathrm{out} = q (1 - \cos \theta) \hat{z} - q \sin \theta \cos \phi\hat{x} - q \sin \theta \sin \phi\hat{y} .$

Now, if many particles scatter off the target, and the target is assumed to have azimuthal symmetry, then the radial ($x$ and $y$) components of the transferred momentum will average to zero. The average momentum transfer will be just $q (1 - \cos \theta) \hat{z}$. If we do the full averaging over all possible scattering events, we get
$$\begin{align}
\Delta \vec{p}_\mathrm{avg} &= \langle \Delta \vec{p} \rangle_\Omega \\
&= \sigma_\mathrm{tot}^{-1} \int \Delta \vec{p}(\theta,\phi) \frac{\mathrm{d} \sigma}{\mathrm{d} \Omega} (\theta) \, \mathrm{d} \Omega \\
&= \sigma_\mathrm{tot}^{-1} \int \left[ q (1 - \cos \theta) \hat{z} - q \sin \theta \cos \phi\hat{x}  - q \sin \theta \sin \phi\hat{y} \right ] \frac{\mathrm{d} \sigma}{\mathrm{d} \Omega} (\theta) \, \mathrm{d} \Omega \\
&= q \hat{z} \sigma_\mathrm{tot}^{-1}  \int  (1 -  \cos \theta)  \frac{\mathrm{d} \sigma}{\mathrm{d} \Omega} (\theta) \, \mathrm{d} \Omega \\[1ex]
&= q \hat{z} \sigma_\mathrm{tr} / \sigma_\mathrm{tot}
\end{align}$$
where the total cross section is $\sigma_\mathrm{tot} = \int \frac{\mathrm{d} \sigma}{\mathrm{d} \Omega} (\theta) \mathrm{d} \Omega .$

Here, the averaging is done by using expected value calculation (see $\frac{\mathrm{d} \sigma}{\mathrm{d} \Omega} (\theta) / \sigma_\mathrm{tot}$ as a probability density function). Therefore, for a given total cross section, one does not need to compute new integrals for every possible momentum in order to determine the average momentum transferred to a target. One just needs to compute $\sigma_\mathrm{tr}$.

== Application ==
This concept is used in calculating charge radius of nuclei such as proton and deuteron by electron scattering experiments.

To this purpose a useful quantity called the scattering vector q having the dimension of inverse length is defined as a function of energy E and scattering angle θ: $q = \frac{\frac{2E}{\hbar c} \sin (\theta/2)}{\left[1+ \frac{2E}{Mc^2} \sin^2 (\theta/2)\right]^{1/2}}$
