= Flat band potential =

Semiconductor-electrolyte junction potential

In semiconductor physics, the flat band potential of a semiconductor defines the potential at which there is no depletion layer at the junction between a semiconductor and an electrolyte or p-n-junction. This is a consequence of the condition that the redox Fermi level of the electrolyte must be equal to the Fermi level of the semiconductor and therefore preventing any band bending of the conduction and valence band. An application of the flat band potential can be found in determining the width of the space charge region in a semiconductor-electrolyte junction. Furthermore, it is used in the Mott-Schottky equation to determine the capacitance of the semiconductor-electrolyte junction and plays a role in the photocurrent of a photoelectrochemical cell. The value of the flat band potential depends on many factors, such as the material, pH and crystal structure of the material

== Background semiconductor physics ==
In semiconductors, valence electrons are located in energy bands. According to band theory, the electrons are either located in the valence band (lower energy) or the conduction band (higher energy), which are separated by an energy gap. In general, electrons will occupy different energy levels following the Fermi-Dirac distribution; for energy levels higher than the Fermi energy Ef, the occupation will be minimal. Electrons in lower levels can be excited into the higher levels through thermal or photoelectric excitations, leaving a positively-charged hole in the band they left. Due to conservation of net charge, the concentration of electrons (n) and of protons or holes (p) in a (pure) semiconductor must always be equal. Semiconductors can be doped to increase these concentrations: n-doping increases the concentration of electrons while p-doping increases the concentration of holes. This also affects the Fermi energy of the electrons: n-doped means a higher Fermi energy, while p-doped means a lower energy. At the interface between a n-doped and p-doped region in a semiconductor, band bending will occur. Due to the different charge distributions in the regions, an electric field will be induced, creating a so-called depletion region at the interface. Similar interfaces also appear at junctions between (doped) semiconductors and other materials, such as metals/electrolytes. A way to counteract this band bending is by applying a potential to the system. This potential would have to be the flat band potential and is defined to be the applied potential at which the conduction and valence bands become flat
